= List of cyclists in the 1906 Tour de France =

In the 1906 Tour de France, 100 cyclists signed up for the but only 76 of them showed up for the start. Among the absentees was Henri Cornet, the winner of the 1904 Tour de France. The starting cyclists included four Belgians, one was Luxembourger (future winner François Faber), two Germans, and the rest were French. Louis Trousselier, winner of the 1905 Tour de France, was present. While the riders were not organized into teams, some shared the same sponsor, although collaboration was not permitted. Before the race began, the top contenders were Cadolle, Aucouturier, Georget, Pottier, Trousselier, Dortignac and Petit-Breton.

Similar to 1905, the cyclists were divided in two categories: the coureurs de vitesse and the coureurs sur machines poinçonnées. Riders in the first category were allowed to change bicycles, which could be an advantage in the mountains, where they could use a bicycle with lower gears. In 1905, sponsors had not been so enthusiastic about entering their cyclists in this category, but in 1906 they had learned that it had a commercial advantage to have cyclists starting in the poinçonnées category, because the average French citizen could identify more with them. In 1906, more than half of the cyclists started in the poinçonnées category, including Lucien Petit-Breton, one of the pre-favourites.

== By starting number ==
Legend
No.	Starting number worn by the rider during the Tour
Pos.	Position in the general classification
DNF	Denotes a rider who did not finish

No.	Name	Nationality	Pos.	Ref
1	Édouard Wattelier	France	7	
2	Georges Sérès	France	DNF	
4	François Beaugendre	France	DNF	
5	Augustin Ringeval	France	DNF	
6	Eugène Christophe	France	9	
7	Arsène Tuale	France	DNF	
8	François Poiry	France	DNF	
9	Gaston Codam	France	DNF	
10	Prosper Rau	France	DNF	
11	Paul Trippier	France	DNF	
13	Emile Bertrand	France	DNF	
14	Pierre Desvages	France	DNF	
15	Henri Timmermann	Belgium	DNF	
17	Marcel Cadolle	France	DNF	
18	Hippolyte Aucouturier	France	DNF	
19	Fernand Gaborias	France	DNF	
21	Aloïs Catteau	Belgium	6	
22	Victor Lascoutounax	France	DNF	
24	Julien Gabory	France	DNF	
25	Henri Gauban	France	DNF	
26	Émile Georget	France	5	
28	Ferdinand Payan	France	12	
30	Martin Soulie	France	DNF	
32	Georges Devilly	France	DNF	
35	Firmin Pauloin	France	DNF	
37	Charles Crupelandt	France	DNF	
38	Ernest Ricaux	France	DNF	
39	Antoine Wattelier	France	10	
40	Fernand Lallement	France	DNF	
41	Frédéric Saillot	France	DNF	
42	Léon Winant	France	13	
43	Jules Chabas	France	DNF	
45	Arthur Pottiez	France	DNF	
46	Georges Fleury	France	11	
47	Pierre Schneider	France	DNF	
48	René Pottier	France	1	
49	Louis Trousselier	France	3	
50	Georges Passerieu	France	2	
51	Maurice Decaup	France	DNF	
52	Albert Baudet	France	DNF	
53	Eugène Duffis	France	DNF	
55	Emile Haemmerlin	France	DNF	
56	Jean-Baptiste Dortignacq	France	DNF	
57	Emile Lamboeuf	France	DNF	
58	D. Gonjeaud	France	DNF	
59	Charles Perreard	France	DNF	
60	Georges Bronchard	France	14	
61	David Dupont	France	DNF	
62	Léon Georget	France	8	
63	Gaston Tuvache	France	DNF	
64	Henri Star	France	DNF	
66	Christophe Laurent	France	DNF	
68	Henri Marchand	France	DNF	
69	Giovanni Gerbi	Italy	DNF	
70	François Faber	Luxembourg	DNF	
71	Julien Lootens	Belgium	DNF	
72	Lucien Mazan	France	4	
73	Pierre Privat	France	DNF	
74	Henri Menez	France	DNF	
76	D. Communal	France	DNF	
77	Edouard Chaumard	France	DNF	
79	Robert Dubois	France	DNF	
80	Robert Wancour	Belgium	DNF	
81	Albert Chartier	France	DNF	
82	Gaston Heneau	France	DNF	
83	E. Vernimmen	France	DNF	
84	Alfred Belleville	France	DNF	
85	Charles Habert	France	DNF	
86	Albert Godefroy	France	DNF	
87	Maurice Carrere	France	DNF	
88	Alfred Pocarius	France	DNF	
89	Maxime Morel	France	DNF	
90	Louis Tanchou	France	DNF	
91	Heini Scholl	Germany	DNF	
93	François Lafourcade	France	DNF	
94	Jean Perreard	France	DNF	
95	Jean Giran	France	DNF	
96	Ludwig Barthelmann	Germany	DNF	
