= 1906 Tour de France, Stage 1 to Stage 7 =

Cycling race stages

Route of the 1906 Tour de France

The 1906 Tour de France was the 4th edition of Tour de France, one of cycling's Grand Tours. The Tour began in Paris on 4 July and Stage 7 occurred on 16 July with a flat stage to Toulouse. The race finished in Paris on 29 July.

== Stage 1 ==
4 July 1906 — Paris to Lille, 275 km (170.9 mi)

Stage 1 result and general classification after stage 1

| Rank | Rider | Time |
|---|---|---|
| 1 | Émile Georget (FRA) | 10h 09' 15" |
| 2 | Georges Passerieu (FRA) | s.t. |
| 3 | Louis Trousselier (FRA) | s.t. |
| 4 | René Pottier (FRA) | + 10" |
| 5 | Lucien Mazan (FRA) | + 3' 45" |
| 6 | Marcel Cadolle (FRA) | + 10' 25" |
| 7 | Léon Georget (FRA) | + 23' 10" |
| 8 | Aloïs Catteau (FRA) | + 33' 05" |
| 9 | François Beaugendre (FRA) | + 48' 45" |
| 10 | Pierre Privat (FRA) | + 48' 57" |

== Stage 2 ==
11 July 1906 — Douai to Nancy, 400 km (248.5 mi)

Stage 2 result

| Rank | Rider | Time |
|---|---|---|
| 1 | René Pottier (FRA) | 14h 21' 30" |
| 2 | Lucien Mazan (FRA) | + 1' 30" |
| 3 | Maurice Decaup (FRA) | + 9' 30" |
| 4 | Émile Georget (FRA) | + 27' 00" |
| 5 | Georges Passerieu (FRA) | + 45' 10" |
| 6 | Louis Trousselier (FRA) | + 45' 11" |
| 7 | François Beaugendre (FRA) | + 1h 12' 45" |
| 8 | Marcel Cadolle (FRA) | + 1h 29' 45" |
| 9 | Édouard Wattelier (FRA) | s.t. |
| 10 | Jean-Baptiste Dortignacq (FRA) | + 1h 34' 20" |

General classification after stage 2

| Rank | Rider | Points |
|---|---|---|
| 1 | René Pottier (FRA) | 5 |
| 2 | Émile Georget (FRA) | 5 |
| 3 | Lucien Mazan (FRA) | 7 |
| 4 | | |
| 5 | | |
| 6 | | |
| 7 | | |
| 8 | | |
| 9 | | |
| 10 | | |

== Stage 3 ==
14 July 1906 — Nancy to Dijon, 416 km (258 mi)

Stage 3 result

| Rank | Rider | Time |
|---|---|---|
| 1 | René Pottier (FRA) | 15h 18' 41" |
| 2 | Georges Passerieu (FRA) | + 47' 52" |
| 3 | Marcel Cadolle (FRA) | + 47' 56" |
| 4 | Lucien Mazan (FRA) | + 48' 29" |
| 5 | Émile Georget (FRA) | + 1h 18' 29" |
| 6 | Aloïs Catteau (BEL) | + 1h 18' 30" |
| 7 | Jean-Baptiste Dortignacq (FRA) | + 1h 18' 31" |
| 8 | Augustin Ringeval (FRA) | + 1h 18' 32" |
| 9 | Pierre Privat (FRA) | + 1h 23' 44" |
| 10 | Hippolyte Aucouturier (FRA) | + 2h 54' 19" |

General classification after stage 3

| Rank | Rider | Points |
|---|---|---|
| 1 | René Pottier (FRA) | 6 |
| 2 | Georges Passerieu (FRA) | 9 |
| 3 | Émile Georget (FRA) | 10 |
| 4 | | |
| 5 | | |
| 6 | | |
| 7 | | |
| 8 | | |
| 9 | | |
| 10 | | |

== Stage 4 ==
16 July 1906 — Dijon to Grenoble, 311 km (193 mi)

Stage 4 result

| Rank | Rider | Time |
|---|---|---|
| 1 | René Pottier (FRA) | 10h 32' 35" |
| 2 | Marcel Cadolle (FRA) | + 14' 31" |
| 3 | Jean-Baptiste Dortignacq (FRA) | + 25' 26" |
| 4 | Lucien Mazan (FRA) | + 25' 28" |
| 5 | Émile Georget (FRA) | + 25' 29" |
| 6 | Georges Passerieu (FRA) | + 40' 31" |
| 7 | Maurice Decaup (FRA) | + 40' 32" |
| 8 | Georges Sérès (FRA) | + 48' 26" |
| 9 | Hippolyte Aucouturier (FRA) | + 1h 12' 37" |
| 10 | Augustin Ringeval (FRA) | + 1h 14' 39" |

General classification after stage 4

| Rank | Rider | Points |
|---|---|---|
| 1 | René Pottier (FRA) | 7 |
| =2 | Georges Passerieu (FRA) | 15 |
| =2 | Émile Georget (FRA) | 15 |
| =2 | Lucien Mazan (FRA) | 15 |
| 5 | | |
| 6 | | |
| 7 | | |
| 8 | | |
| 9 | | |
| 10 | | |

== Stage 5 ==
18 July 1906 — Grenoble to Nice, 345 km (214 mi)

Stage 5 result

| Rank | Rider | Time |
|---|---|---|
| 1 | René Pottier (FRA) | 12h 27' 00" |
| 2 | Georges Passerieu (FRA) | + 26' 00" |
| 3 | Eugène Christophe (FRA) | + 26' 01" |
| 4 | Marcel Cadolle (FRA) | + 41' 30" |
| 5 | Émile Georget (FRA) | + 41' 31" |
| 6 | Lucien Mazan (FRA) | + 41' 32" |
| 7 | Pierre Privat (FRA) | + 42' 00" |
| 8 | Jean-Baptiste Dortignacq (FRA) | + 45' 00" |
| 9 | Louis Trousselier (FRA) | + 49' 00" |
| 10 | Maurice Decaup (FRA) | + 1h 07' 00" |

General classification after stage 5

| Rank | Rider | Points |
|---|---|---|
| 1 | René Pottier (FRA) | 8 |
| 2 | Georges Passerieu (FRA) | 17 |
| 3 | Émile Georget (FRA) | 20 |
| 4 | | |
| 5 | | |
| 6 | | |
| 7 | | |
| 8 | | |
| 9 | | |
| 10 | | |

== Stage 6 ==
20 July 1906 — Nice to Marseille, 292 km (181 mi)

Stage 6 result

| Rank | Rider | Time |
|---|---|---|
| 1 | Georges Passerieu (FRA) | 11h 21' 17" |
| 2 | René Pottier (FRA) | + 1" |
| 3 | Marcel Cadolle (FRA) | + 13' 07" |
| 4 | Louis Trousselier (FRA) | + 30' 41" |
| 5 | Édouard Wattelier (FRA) | + 30' 42" |
| 6 | Émile Georget (FRA) | + 38' 34" |
| 7 | Jean-Baptiste Dortignacq (FRA) | + 44' 23" |
| 8 | Léon Georget (FRA) | + 44' 24" |
| 9 | Augustin Ringeval (FRA) | + 44' 25" |
| 10 | Hippolyte Aucouturier (FRA) | + 49' 43" |

General classification after stage 6

| Rank | Rider | Points |
|---|---|---|
| 1 | René Pottier (FRA) | 10 |
| 2 | Georges Passerieu (FRA) | 18 |
| 3 | Émile Georget (FRA) | 26 |
| 4 | | |
| 5 | | |
| 6 | | |
| 7 | | |
| 8 | | |
| 9 | | |
| 10 | | |

== Stage 7 ==
20 July 1906 — Marseille to Toulouse, 480 km (300 mi)

Stage 7 result

| Rank | Rider | Time |
|---|---|---|
| 1 | Louis Trousselier (FRA) | 17h 24' 00" |
| 2 | Georges Passerieu (FRA) | s.t. |
| 3 | Lucien Mazan (FRA) | s.t. |
| 4 | Marcel Cadolle (FRA) | + 1h 08' 00" |
| 5 | René Pottier (FRA) | + 1h 08' 02" |
| 6 | Jean-Baptiste Dortignacq (FRA) | + 1h 31' 00" |
| 7 | Ferdinand Payan (FRA) | + 1h 39' 00" |
| 8 | Émile Georget (FRA) | + 2h 11' 00" |
| 9 | Eugène Christophe (FRA) | + 3h 04' 09" |
| 10 | Georges Fleury (FRA) | + 3h 09' 10" |

General classification after stage 7

| Rank | Rider | Points |
|---|---|---|
| 1 | René Pottier (FRA) | 15 |
| 2 | Georges Passerieu (FRA) | 20 |
| 3 | Marcel Cadolle (FRA) | 30 |
| 4 | | |
| 5 | | |
| 6 | | |
| 7 | | |
| 8 | | |
| 9 | | |
| 10 | | |
