= 1906 Tour de France, Stage 8 to Stage 13 =

Cycling race stages

Route of the 1906 Tour de France

The 1906 Tour de France was the 4th edition of Tour de France, one of cycling's Grand Tours. The Tour began in Paris on 4 July and Stage 8 occurred on 18 July with a flat stage from Toulouse. The race finished in Paris on 29 July.

== Stage 8 ==
18 July 1906 — Toulouse to Bayonne, 300 km (186.4 mi)

Stage 8 result

Rank	Rider	Time
1	Jean-Baptiste Dortignacq (FRA)	10h 46' 02"
2	Louis Trousselier (FRA)	s.t.
3	René Pottier (FRA)	+ 27' 58"
4	Georges Passerieu (FRA)	+ 27' 00"
5	Lucien Mazan (FRA)	s.t.
6	Marcel Cadolle (FRA)	+ 1h 58' 58"
7	Émile Georget (FRA)	+ 1h 59' 00"
8	Édouard Wattelier (FRA)	+ 1h 59' 01"
9	Aloïs Catteau (BEL)	+ 2h 08' 58"
10	Eugène Christophe (FRA)	+ 2h 26' 58"

General classification after stage 8

Rank	Rider	Points
1	René Pottier (FRA)	18
2	Georges Passerieu (FRA)	24
3	Marcel Cadolle (FRA)	36
4		
5		
6		
7		
8		
9		
10		

== Stage 9 ==
20 July 1906 — Bayonne to Bordeaux, 338 km (210.0 mi)

Stage 9 result

Rank	Rider	Time
1	Louis Trousselier (FRA)	12h 03' 00"
2	Lucien Mazan (FRA)	+ 2"
3	Jean-Baptiste Dortignacq (FRA)	+ 1h 10' 00"
4	René Pottier (FRA)	+ 1h 10' 02"
5	Marcel Cadolle (FRA)	+ 1h 27' 00"
6	Georges Passerieu (FRA)	+ 1h 27' 01"
7	Émile Georget (FRA)	+ 1h 27' 02"
8	Édouard Wattelier (FRA)	+ 1h 43' 00"
9	Aloïs Catteau (BEL)	+ 1h 43' 01"
10	Antoine Wattelier (FRA)	+ 1h 43' 02"

General classification after stage 9

Rank	Rider	Points
1	René Pottier (FRA)	22
2	Georges Passerieu (FRA)	30
3	Marcel Cadolle (FRA)	41
4		
5		
6		
7		
8		
9		
10		

== Stage 10 ==
22 July 1906 — Bordeaux to Nantes, 391 km (243 mi)

Stage 10 result

Rank	Rider	Time
1	Louis Trousselier (FRA)	15h 21' 00"
2	Lucien Mazan (FRA)	s.t.
3	Georges Passerieu (FRA)	+ 55' 30"
4	René Pottier (FRA)	+ 55' 31"
5	Marcel Cadolle (FRA)	+ 59' 00"
6	Antoine Wattelier (FRA)	+ 1h 52' 00"
7	Émile Georget (FRA)	+ 2h 34' 35"
8	Eugène Christophe (FRA)	+ 2h 34' 36"
9	Ferdinand Payan (FRA)	+ 3h 08' 10"
10	Georges Fleury (FRA)	+ 4h 22' 00"

General classification after stage 10

Rank	Rider	Points
1	René Pottier (FRA)	26
2	Georges Passerieu (FRA)	33
3	Marcel Cadolle (FRA)	46
4		
5		
6		
7		
8		
9		
10		

== Stage 11 ==
24 July 1906 — Nantes to Brest, 321 km (199 mi)

Stage 11 result

Rank	Rider	Time
1	Louis Trousselier (FRA)	12h 54' 00"
2	René Pottier (FRA)	s.t.
3	Georges Passerieu (FRA)	s.t.
4	Lucien Mazan (FRA)	+ 30"
5	Aloïs Catteau (BEL)	+ 44' 00"
6	Émile Georget (FRA)	+ 1h 07' 00"
7	Édouard Wattelier (FRA)	s.t.
8	Antoine Wattelier (FRA)	s.t.
9	Léon Georget (FRA)	+ 1h 22' 00"
10	Eugène Christophe (FRA)	+ 3h 26' 00"

General classification after stage 11

Rank	Rider	Points
1	René Pottier (FRA)	28
2	Georges Passerieu (FRA)	36
3	Lucien Mazan (FRA)	52
4		
5		
6		
7		
8		
9		
10		

== Stage 12 ==
26 July 1906 — Brest to Caen, 415 km (258 mi)

Stage 12 result

Rank	Rider	Time
1	Georges Passerieu (FRA)	18h 25' 00"
2	René Pottier (FRA)	s.t.
3	Louis Trousselier (FRA)	s.t.
4	Georges Fleury (FRA)	+ 1h 10' 00"
5	Aloïs Catteau (BEL)	+ 1h 40' 00"
6	Léon Georget (FRA)	s.t.
7	Émile Georget (FRA)	s.t.
8	Édouard Wattelier (FRA)	+ 2h 23' 00"
9	Lucien Mazan (FRA)	+ 3h 55' 00"
10	Eugène Christophe (FRA)	+ 6h 06' 00"

General classification after stage 12

Rank	Rider	Points
1	René Pottier (FRA)	30
2	Georges Passerieu (FRA)	37
3	Louis Trousselier (FRA)	56
4		
5		
6		
7		
8		
9		
10		

== Stage 13 ==
29 July 1906 — Caen to Paris, 259 km (161 mi)

Stage 13 result

Rank	Rider	Time
1	René Pottier (FRA)	8h 04' 52"
2	Georges Passerieu (FRA)	s.t.
3	Louis Trousselier (FRA)	+ 3' 03"
4	Lucien Mazan (FRA)	+ 48' 19"
5	Édouard Wattelier (FRA)	s.t.
6	Antoine Wattelier (FRA)	+ 1h 01' 56"
7	Eugène Christophe (FRA)	+ 1h 06' 18"
8	Aloïs Catteau (BEL)	+ 1h 10' 19"
9	Léon Winant (FRA)	+ 1h 23' 03"
10	Léon Georget (FRA)	+ 1h 43' 00"

General classification after stage 13

Rank	Rider	Points
1	René Pottier (FRA)	31
2	Georges Passerieu (FRA)	39
3	Louis Trousselier (FRA)	59
4	Lucien Mazan (FRA)	65
5	Émile Georget (FRA)	80
6	Aloïs Catteau (BEL)	129
7	Édouard Wattelier (FRA)	137
8	Léon Georget (FRA)	152
9	Eugène Christophe (FRA)	156
10	Antoine Wattelier (FRA)	168
