= Pierre Privat =

French cyclist (1880–1915)

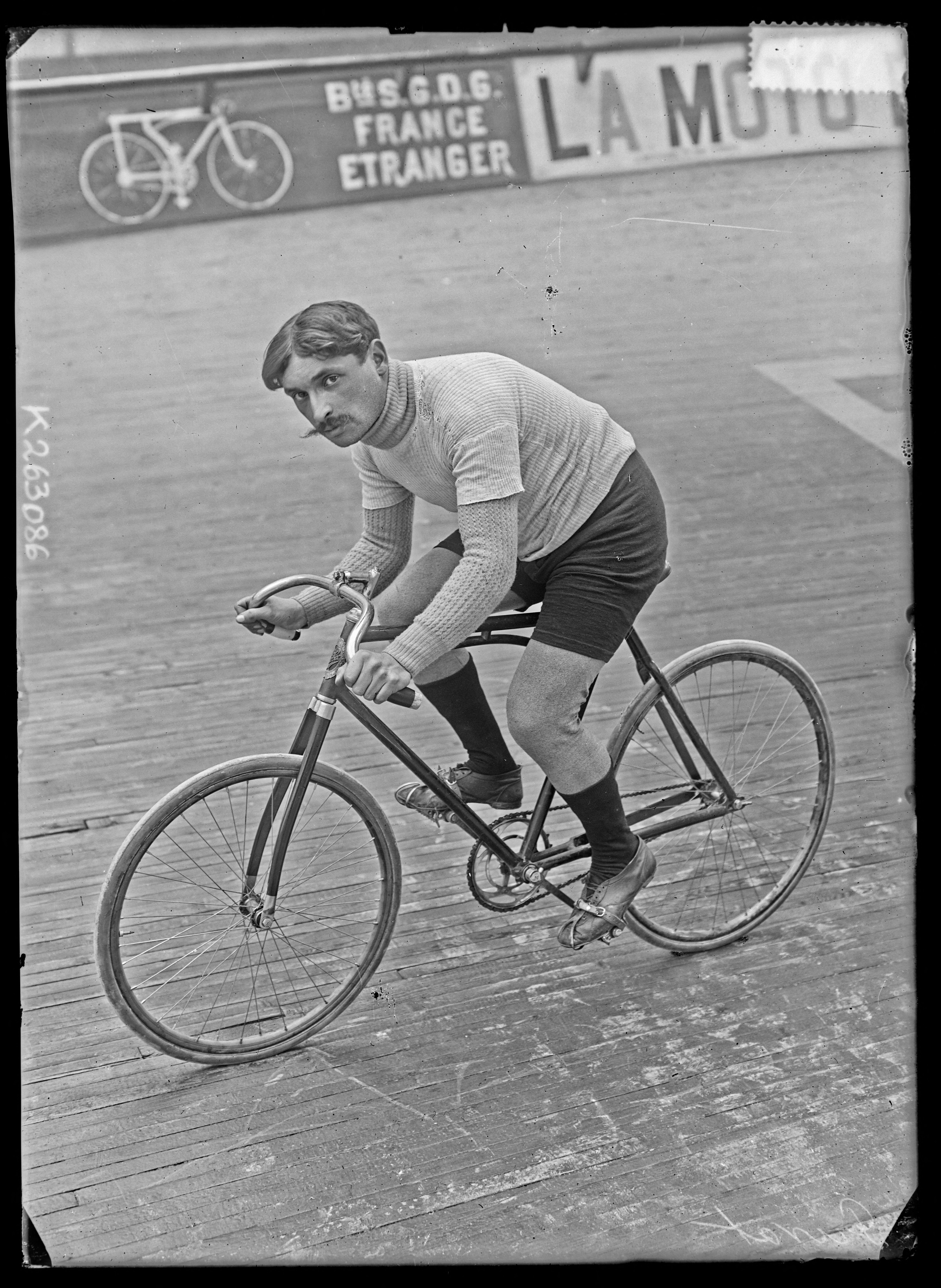
- Privat in 1907

Personal information
- Full name: Pierre Marie Gonzague Privat
- Born: Pierre Marie Gonzague Privat; 26 August 1880 Paris (17th arrondissement), France
- Died: 19 October 1915 (aged 35) Aubigny-en-Artois, France
- Height: 161 cm (5 ft 3 in)

Cycling career
- Sport: Cycling
- Discipline: Road
- Role: Rider

Professional team
- 1906–1910: Peugeot

Pierre Marie Gonzague Privat (26 August 1880 – 19 October 1915) was a French professional road cyclist and cartoonist. He competed professionally from 1906 to 1910, mainly as a domestique for leading riders of his era, and took part in four editions of the Tour de France. Turned to drawing and caricature, he became known for his cycling-themed posters including many official posters is the main cycling events. He was killed during World War II.

== Biography ==
Privat was born in the 17th arrondissement of Paris on 26 August 1880. He became a professional cyclist at the relatively late age of 26, joining the prominent Peugeot team alongside riders such as Lucien Petit-Breton, Giovanni Gerbi, René Pottier, Émile Friol and Georges Passerieu. Although considered a capable rider, he was primarily employed in a supporting role and therefore never achieved major victories. However he still had multiple top-10 achievements in the international classic cycle races.

He rode the Tour de France four times. In 1907 he was team member of Émile Georget who was about to win the 1907 Tour de France. However, in Bayonne Georget suffered a puncture; and Privat gave him is bike to continue. Due to this, Georget was disclassified because it was in that era not allowed and Georget didn't win the Tour. Privat finished this Tour on the 11th place overall; his best Tour de France achievement. Toward the end of his cycling career, Privat became a cartoonist and caricaturists and became known for his cycling-themed posters. He designed numerous posters for major bicycle manufacturers and contributed to several Parisian sports newspapers.

During World War I, Privat served as a sergeant in the 274th Infantry Regiment. He died on 19 October 1915 at the evacuation hospital in Aubigny-en-Artois from wounds sustained in combat.

== Major results ==
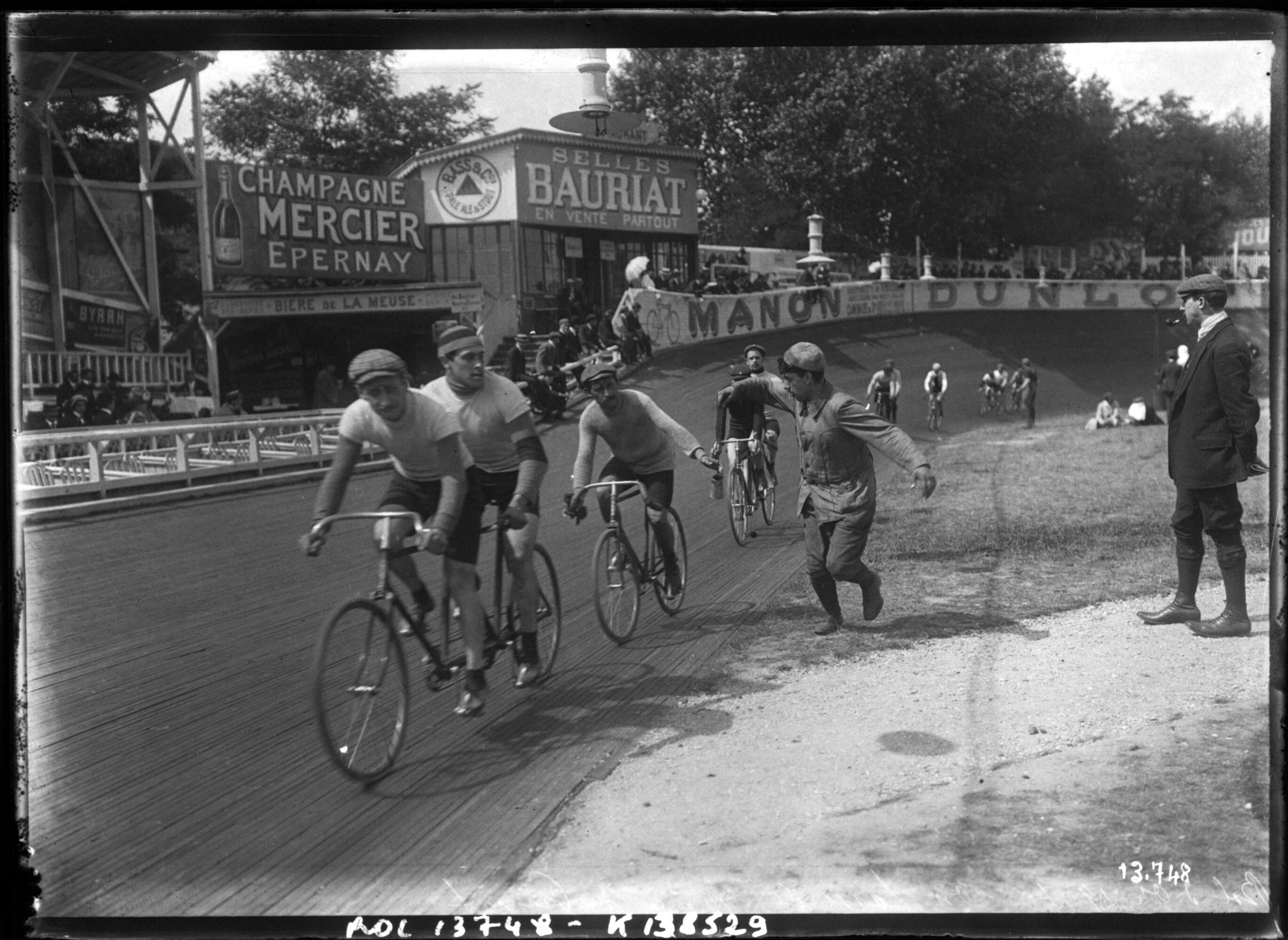
Privat in the 1907 Bol d'Or cycle race (24-hour race)

1906
1906 Tour de France

10th Stage 1
9th Stage 3
7th Stage 5

7th Paris–Tours

1907
11th Overall Tour de France

5th Stage 13
6th Stage 12
7th Stage 11

6th National Road Championships, Versailles
10th Paris–Roubaix
4th Paris–Dieppe
9th Paris–Brussels
6th Bol d'Or cycle race (24-hour race), Paris

1908
7th Bordeaux–Paris

1909
1st La Flèche–Mantes
8th Tours–Bordeaux
7th Paris–Trouville–Paris
6th Rouen–Roubaix

=== Grand Tour general classification results ===
Stage races	1906	1907	1908	1910
Tour de France	DNF	11th	DNF	DNF

=== Classic cycle races results ===
Classic cycle races	1906	1907	1908	1909	1910	1913
Paris–Roubaix	—	10th	—	—	—	83rd
Paris–Tours	7th	—	—	12th	—	—
Bordeaux–Paris	—	—	7th	—	—	—
Paris—Brussels	—	9th	—	—	—	—
