= 1906 Paris–Roubaix =

Cycling race

Race details
- Dates: 15 April 1906
- Stages: 1
- Distance: 270 km (170 mi)
- Winning time: 9h 59' 30"

Results
	Winner	Henri Cornet (FRA)
	Second	Marcel Cadolle (FRA)
	Third	René Pottier (FRA)

The 1906 Paris–Roubaix was the 11th edition of the Paris–Roubaix, a classic one-day cycle race in France. The single day event was held on 15 April 1906 and stretched 270 km (168 mi) from Paris to its end in a velodrome in Roubaix. The winner was Henri Cornet from France.

== Results ==
Final results (1–10)
Rank	Cyclist	Time
1	Henri Cornet (FRA)	9h 59' 30″
2	Marcel Cadolle (FRA)	+0' 00″
3	René Pottier (FRA)	+5' 15″
4	Louis Trousselier (FRA)	+8' 45″
5	César Garin (ITA)	+14' 45″
6	Hippolyte Aucouturier (FRA)	+21' 45″
7	Georges Passerieu (FRA)	+23' 45″
8	Emile Georget (FRA)	+2hr 00' 45″
9	F. Saint (FRA)	+2hr 25' 45″
10	Georges Fleury (FRA)	+2hr 35' 45″
