= 1907 Paris–Roubaix =

Cycling race

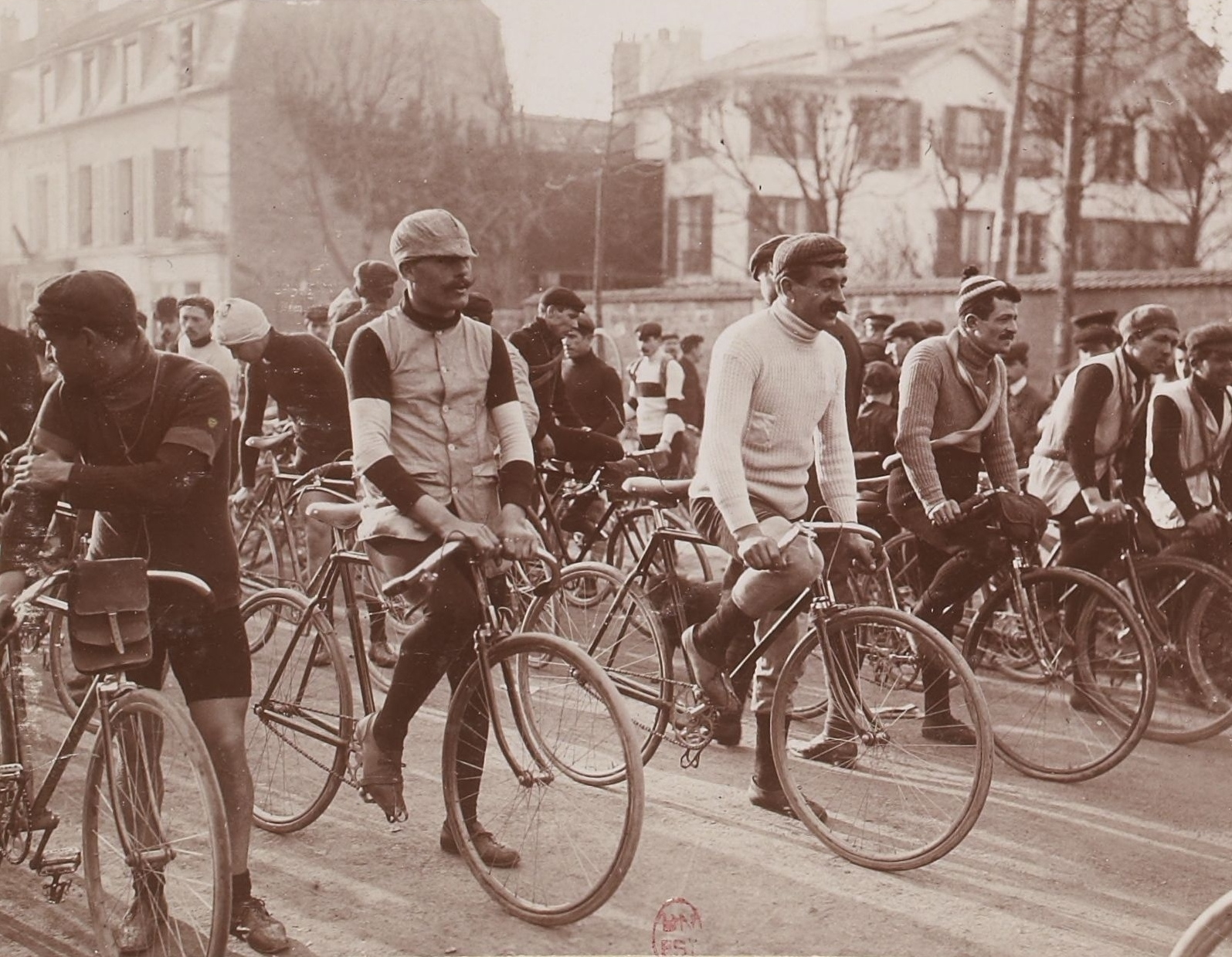
- Riders at the 1907 Paris–Roubaix

Race details
- Dates: 31 March 1907
- Stages: 1
- Distance: 270 km (170 mi)
- Winning time: 8h 45' 00"

Results
	Winner	Georges Passerieu (FRA)
	Second	Cyrille Van Hauwaert (BEL)
	Third	Louis Trousselier (FRA)

The 1907 Paris–Roubaix was the 12th edition of the Paris–Roubaix, a classic one-day cycle race in France. The single day event was held on 31 March 1907 and stretched 270 km (168 mi) from Paris to its end in a velodrome in Roubaix. The winner was Georges Passerieu from France.

== Results ==
Final results (1–10)
Rank	Cyclist	Time
1	Georges Passerieu (FRA)	8h 45' 00″
2	Cyrille Van Hauwaert (BEL)	+1' 00″
3	Louis Trousselier (FRA)	+3' 00″
4	Gustave Garrigou (FRA)	+4' 30″
5	Augustin Ringeval (FRA)	+5' 00″
6	Emile Georget (FRA)	+15' 00″
7	Léon Georget (FRA)	+21' 00″
8	Henri Cornet (FRA)	+28' 00″
9	François Faber (LUX)	+39' 00″
10	Pierre Privat (FRA)	+40' 00″
