= 1908 Paris–Roubaix =

Cycling race

Race details
- Dates: 19 April 1908
- Stages: 1
- Distance: 271 km (168 mi)
- Winning time: 10h 34' 25"

Results
	Winner	Cyrille Van Hauwaert (BEL)
	Second	Georges Lorgeou (FRA)
	Third	François Faber (LUX)

The 1908 Paris–Roubaix was the 13th edition of the Paris–Roubaix, a classic one-day cycle race in France. The single day event was held on 19 April 1908 and stretched 271 km (168 mi) from Paris to its end in a velodrome in Roubaix. The winner was Cyrille Van Hauwaert from Belgium.

== Results ==
Final results (1–10)
Rank	Cyclist	Time
1	Cyrille Van Hauwaert (BEL)	10h 34' 25″
2	Georges Lorgeou (FRA)	+3' 35″
3	François Faber (LUX)	+5' 05″
4	August Ringeval (FRA)	+11' 35″
5	Louis Trousselier (FRA)	+21' 35″
6	Georges Passerieu (FRA)	+23' 35″
7	André Pottier (FRA)	+24' 35″
8	Gustave Garrigou (FRA)	+24' 35″
9	Emile Georget (FRA)	+29' 35″
10	Jules Masselis (BEL)	+32' 35″
