= 1901 Paris–Tours =

Race details
- Dates: 30 June 1901
- Stages: 1
- Distance: 253 km (157.2 mi)
- Winning time: 9h 22' 35"

Results
	Winner	Jean Fischer (FRA)
	Second	Georges Lorgeou (FRA)
	Third	Édouard Wattelier (FRA)

The 1901 Paris–Tours was the second edition of the Paris–Tours cycle race and was held on 30 June 1901. The race started in Paris and finished in Tours. The race was won by Jean Fischer.

== General classification ==
Final general classification

Rank	Rider	Time
1	Jean Fischer (FRA)	9h 22' 35"
2	Georges Lorgeou (FRA)	c. + 1" (Note: No actual time is given for Lorgeou. His finish is given as "to 15 metres" behind the winner, which would equate with about one second.)
3	Édouard Wattelier (FRA)	+ 42' 59"
4	Antony Wattelier (FRA)	+ 47' 10"
5	J. Chalansonnet (FRA)	+ 50' 07"
6	Victor Lefèvre (FRA)	+ 1h 21' 48"
7	Achille Germain (FRA)	
8	Georges Clément (FRA)	+ 1h 43' 25"
9	Launay (FRA)	+ 1h 53' 25"
