= Col du Ballon d'Alsace =

Mountain pass in France

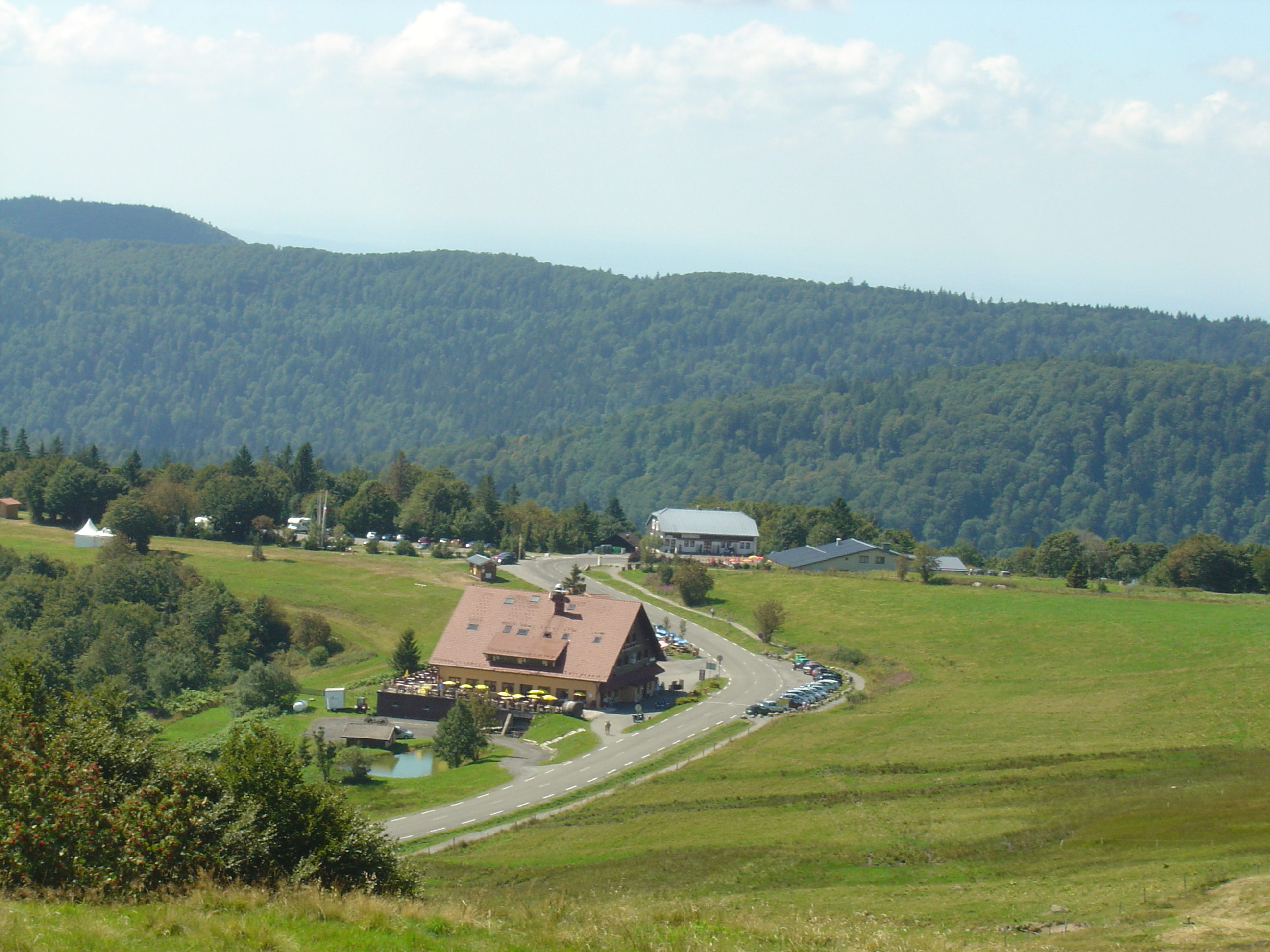
- Boutiques and restaurants at the col

- Location within Alps
- Elevation: 1,178 m (3,865 ft)
- Traversed by: D465

Third Approach
- Location: Vosges, France
- Range: Vosges Mountains
- Coordinates: 47°49′13.5″N 6°50′6″E

The Col du Ballon d'Alsace (French pronunciation: [kɔl dy balɔ̃ dalzas]; 1,178 m (3,865 ft)) is a mountain pass situated close to the summit of the Ballon d'Alsace (1,247 m (4,091 ft)) in the Vosges Mountains of France. It connects Saint-Maurice-sur-Moselle (Vosges) with Masevaux (Haut-Rhin) and Belfort.

The Ballon d'Alsace was the first official mountain climb in the Tour de France on 11 July 1905 although the tour had crossed the slightly lower Col de la République (1,161 m (3,809 ft)) in each of the previous two years. The first rider to the top of the Ballon was René Pottier, with the stage being won by Hippolyte Aucouturier. Stage 9 of the 2005 Tour crossed this pass on the centenary of the original climb.

== Details of the climbs ==
The "historic" ascent, as used in the early Tours de France, is from Saint-Maurice-sur-Moselle (north). From here, the ascent is 9.0 km long climbing 619 m at an average of 6.9%.

From the south, the climb starts at Malvaux, 4.5 km north of Giromagny. The climb is 12.4 km long, gaining 643 m at an average of 5.2%.

From Sewen (east), the climb is 13.2 km long, at an average of 5.1%, gaining 678 m in height. This climb starts on the D466 and joins the route from the south after 10 km, at the Col du Langenberg (1,060 m (3,478 ft)). The middle section (between 4 and 9 km) is steep, in excess of 8%.

== Tour de France ==
The Ballon d'Alsace was first crossed by the Tour de France on the second stage of the 1905 tour, from Nancy to Dijon. In the first two Tours de France, the cycle race had crossed the Col de la République (1,161 m (3,809 ft)) south of Saint-Etienne. Following violent incidents at the Col de la République in 1904, the tour's organiser Henri Desgrange decided to look elsewhere for challenges for the riders and at the same time gain publicity for the tour and distract the public from the cheating that had taken place in 1904.

Although only 17 metres higher than the Col de la République, the climb to the Ballon d'Alsace was steeper and Desgrange declared that no cyclist would be able to ride over it. Despite Desgrange's "over-dramatic" concerns, René Pottier crossed the summit first by riding all the way to the top and, although he was passed by Hippolyte Aucouturier before the finish at Besançon, Pottier became the leader of the tour. Unfortunately, the pace of his ascent exacerbated injuries that he had sustained in a fall on Stage 1, and Pottier was forced to withdraw from the race the next day. Following the 1905 tour's successful passage over the Ballon d'Alsace, Desgrange declared:

the ascent of the Ballon d'Alsace ... was one of the most thrilling sights I have ever witnessed, and confirms my opinion that man's courage knows no limits and a highly trained athlete can aspire to remarkable performances.

Thus was the myth born that the Col d'Alsace was the first mountain crossing in the history of the Tour de France, which is still maintained in the Tour's official history.

The Tour returned to the Ballon d'Alsace the following year and Pottier was again the first rider over the summit. He arrived at Saint-Maurice-sur-Moselle in a group of 19 riders: according to L'Auto: "At the foot of the climb, Pottier bolted, as if the bell had sounded the final lap of a track race. He hadn't reached the first hairpin before the group was torn apart." The other riders soon dropped away with only Augustin Ringeval able to briefly keep in contact with Pottier although even he was dropped well before the summit:

Pottier and Ringeval are alone now. A brief but terrifying duel breaks out, until, making a final demand from his boundless reserves, the leader pulls away into the teeth of the gradient. Ringeval loses ground, makes it up again with a magnificent effort, then drops back again, done for!

Pottier crossed the summit alone, over four minutes ahead of the next rider and maintained his lead into the stage finish at Dijon, going on to win the whole race in Paris three weeks later.

Those of us who witnessed his interminable, solitary, high-speed ride were left wondering whether it had not all been a dream, and asking ourselves what mysterious force it is that possesses the human organism and allows it to push back the boundaries of the possible.

Pottier was found hanged at his home the following January, having committed suicide. Following his death, a monument to him was erected at the summit of the Col du Ballon d'Alsace.

=== Passages in the Tour de France ===
The Tour de France crossed over the Col du Ballon d'Alsace every year between 1905 and 1914, and then five times in the 1930s. Since World War II, the crossings have been less frequent, though it has in total crossed the mountain twenty-four times in its history.

Year	Stage	Category	Start	Finish	Leader at the summit
2026	14	1	Mulhouse	Le Markstein Fellering	Valentin Paret-Peintre (FRA)
2026	13	1	Dole	Belfort	Tom Pidcock (GBR)
2023	20	2	Belfort	Le Markstein	Giulio Ciccone (ITA)
2019	6	1	Mulhouse	La Planche des Belles Filles	Tim Wellens (BEL)
2005	9	1	Gérardmer	Mulhouse	Michael Rasmussen (DEN)
1997	18	2 (Note: In 1997, the tour only climbed as far as the Col du Langenberg (1,060 m (3,478 ft)) at the junction of D465 and D466.)	Colmar	Montbéliard	Didier Rous (FRA)
1982	2	1	Basel	Nancy	Bernard Vallet (FRA)
1961	6	2	Strasbourg	Belfort	Jozef Planckaert (BEL)
1952	8	2	Nancy	Mulhouse	Raphaël Géminiani (FRA)
1937	4		Metz	Belfort	Erich Bautz (GER)
1936	4		Metz	Belfort	Federico Ezquerra (ESP)
1934	4		Metz	Belfort	Félicien Vervaecke (BEL)
1933	4		Metz	Belfort	Vicente Trueba (ESP)
1930	18		Belfort	Metz	Antonin Magne (FRA)
1914	13		Belfort	Longwy	Henri Pélissier (FRA) / Jean Alavoine (FRA)
1913	13		Belfort	Longwy	Marcel Buysse (BEL)
1912	3		Longwy	Belfort	Odile Defraye (BEL)
1911	3		Longwy	Belfort	François Faber (LUX)
1910	3		Metz	Belfort	Emile Georget (FRA)
1909	3		Metz	Belfort	François Faber (LUX)
1908	3		Metz	Belfort	Gustave Garrigou (FRA)
1907	3		Metz	Belfort	Emile Georget (FRA)
1906	3		Nancy	Dijon	René Pottier (FRA)
1905	2		Nancy	Besançon	René Pottier (FRA)

=== Tour de France stage finishes ===
Between 1967 and 1979, the tour had four mountain top finishes at the summit of the Col du Ballon d'Alsace.

Year	Stage	Start of stage	Distance (km)	Category of climb	Stage winner	Yellow jersey
1979	13	Metz	202	1	Pierre-Raymond Villemiane (FRA)	Joop Zoetemelk (NED)
1972	17	Pontarlier	213	1	Bernard Thévenet (FRA)	Eddy Merckx (BEL)
1969	6	Mulhouse	133.5	1	Eddy Merckx (BEL)	Eddy Merckx (BEL)
1967	8	Strasbourg	215	2	Lucien Aimar (FRA)	Roger Pingeon (FRA)

== Tour de France Femmes ==
The col was crossed on Stage 8 of the 2022 Tour de France Femmes.

Year	Stage	Category	Start	Finish	Leader at the summit
2022	8	1	Lure	La Planche des Belles Filles	Mavi García (ESP)

== Amateur cycling ==
The Col du Ballon d'Alsace is also used by amateur cyclists on the "Trois Ballons" sportive ride held in June (together with the climbs over the Grand Ballon and the Ballon de Servance).

== Gallery ==
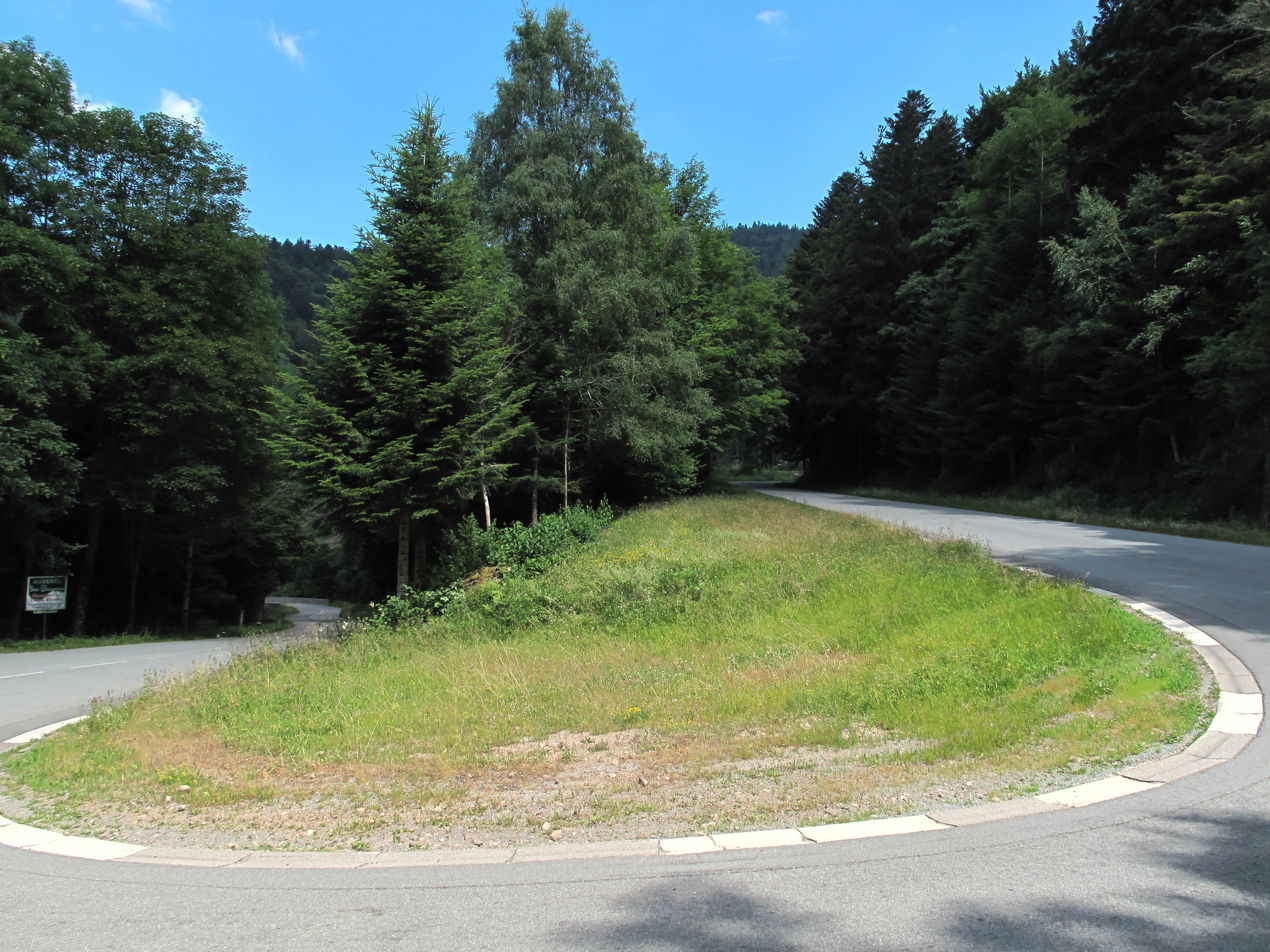
Hairpin turn

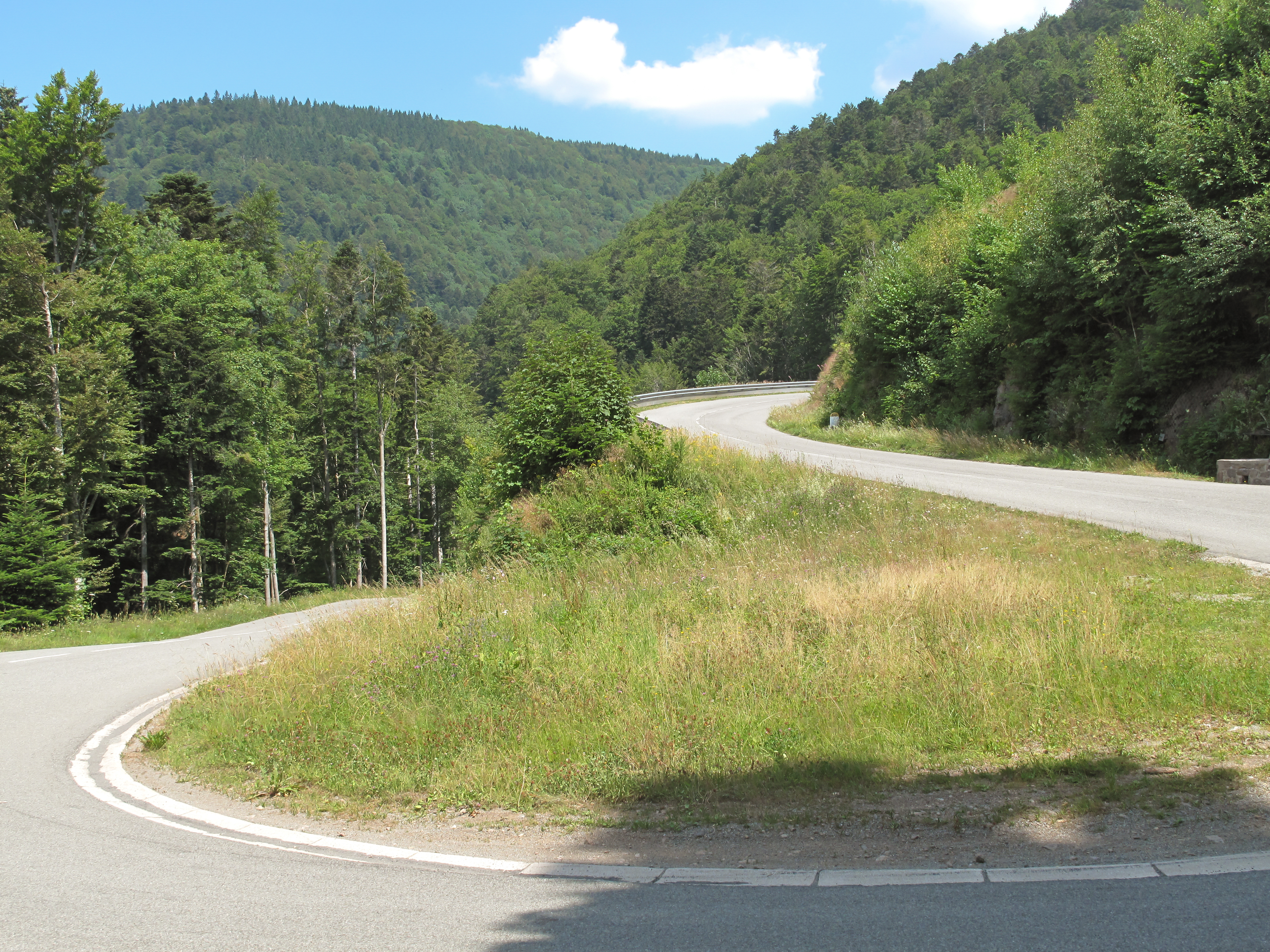
Hairpin turn

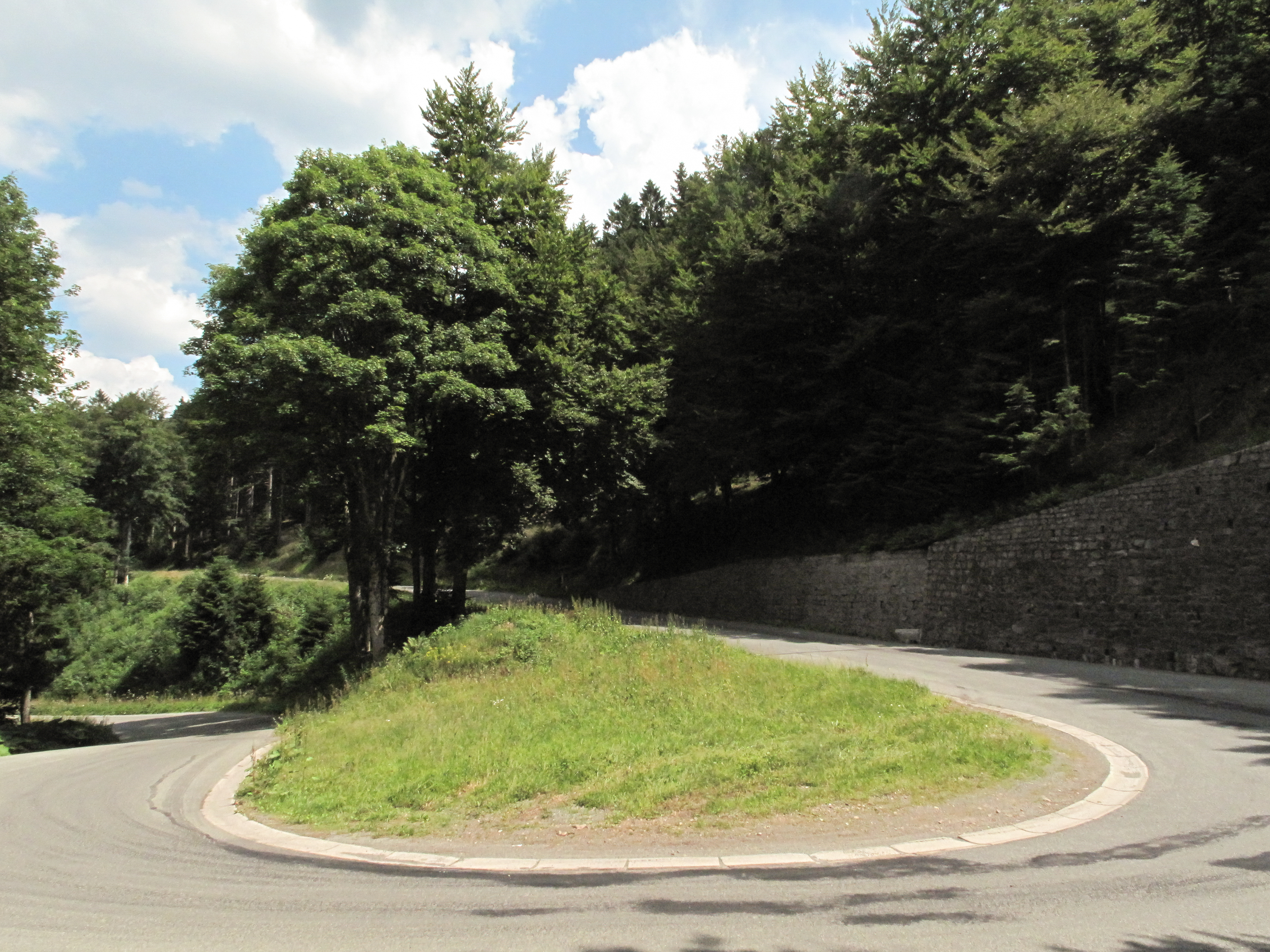
Hairpin turn

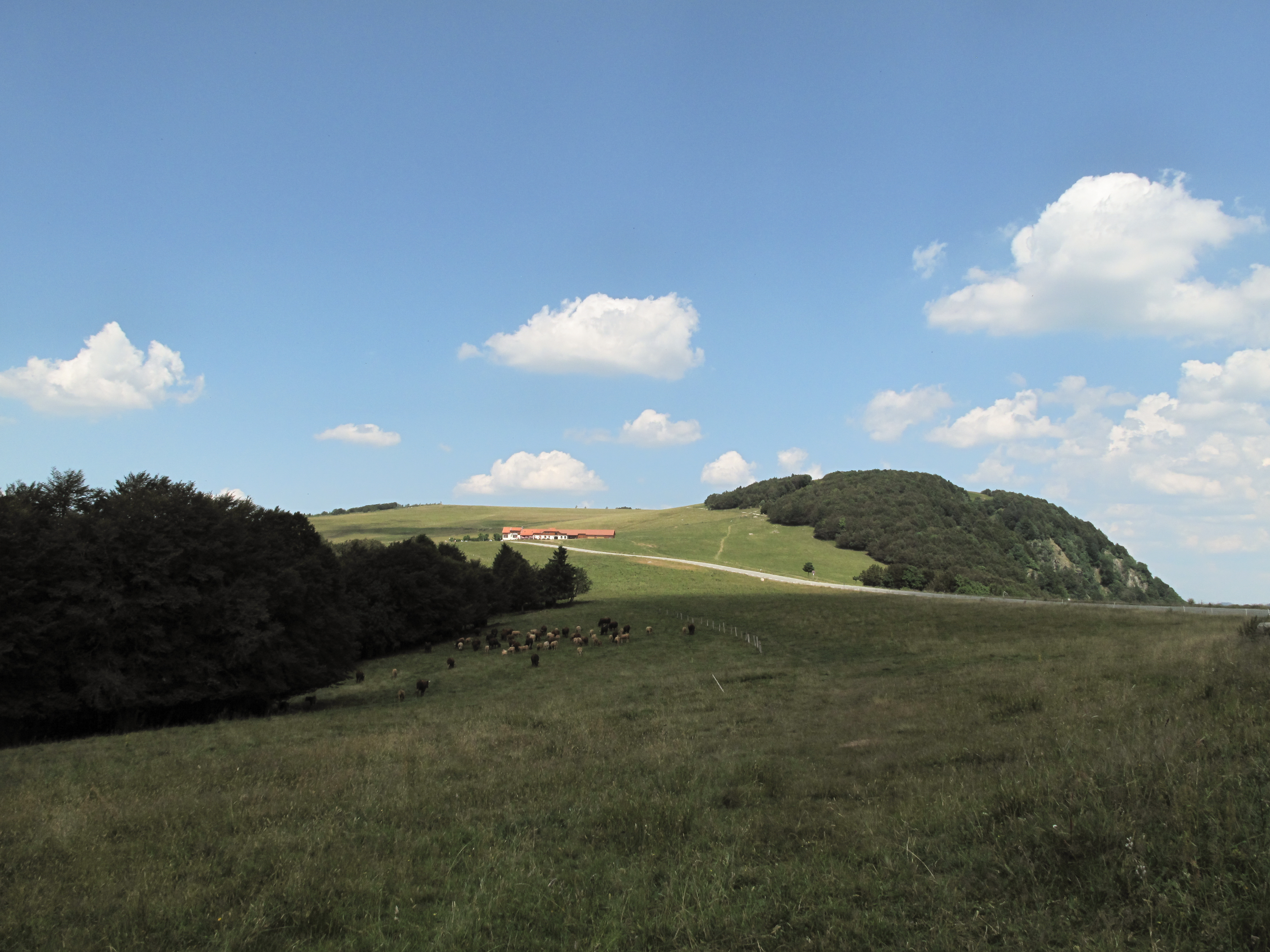
Road panorama

== See also ==
- List of highest paved roads in Europe
- List of mountain passes
