= Georges Lorgeou =

French cyclist

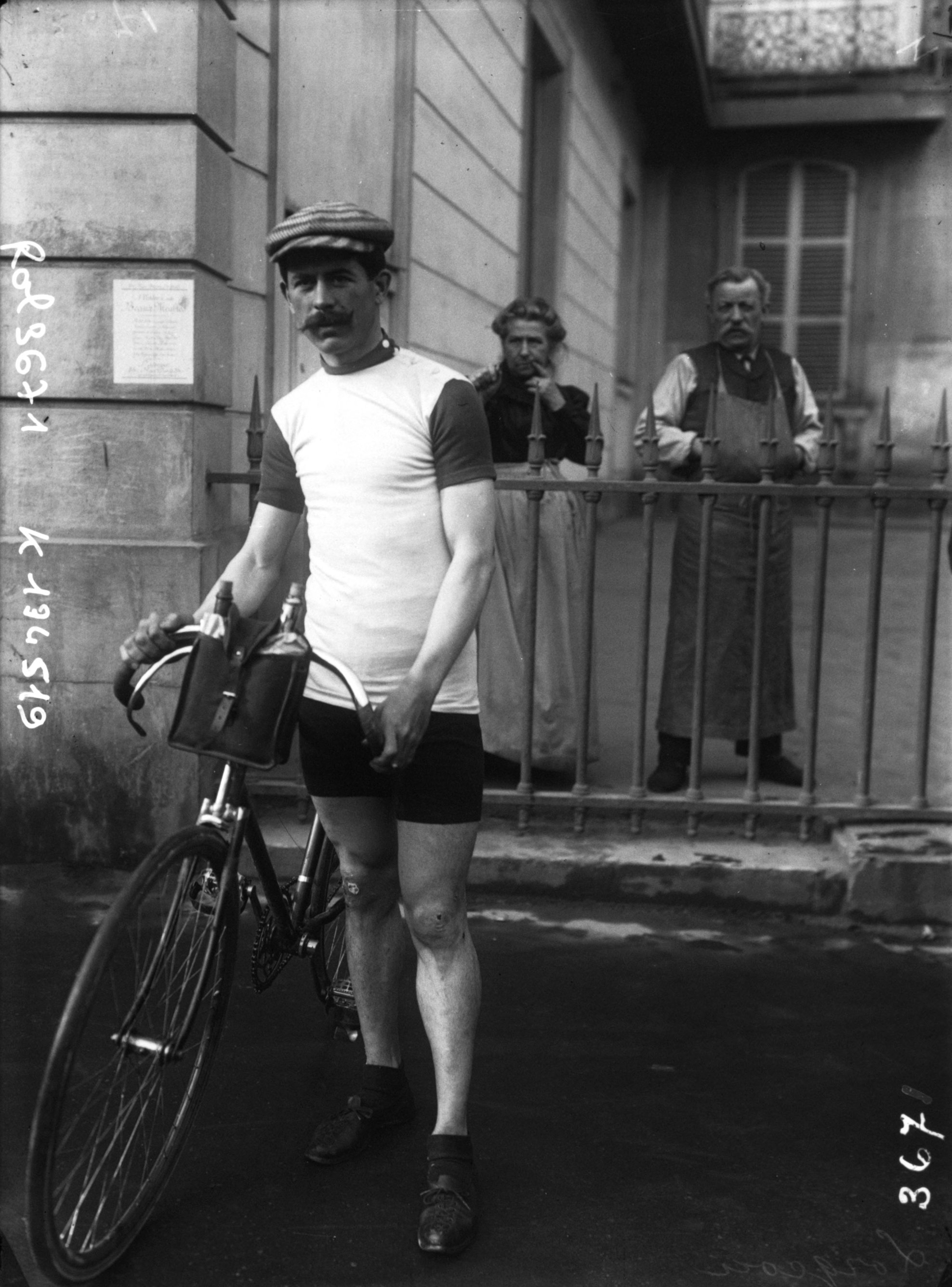
- Georges Lorgeou in 1909

Personal information
- Born: July 17, 1880 Paris, France
- Died: May 5, 1957 (aged 76) Le Mans, France

Cycling career
- Sport: Cycling
- Discipline: Road
- Role: Rider

Professional team

Georges Lorgeou (17 July 1880 – 5 May 1957) was a French road cyclist active from 1900 to 1913. He achieved podium places in some of the main international cycling races in his era: Paris–Tours, Paris–Roubaix and Milano–Modena. He was a cyclist in two Tour de France editions including in the inaugural 1903 Tour de France.

== Career ==
Born in Paris, Lorgeou competed from 1900 through 1913. In 1900 he finished second in one of the earliest French National Road Race Championships for non-professionals.

In 1901, Lorgeou finished second in Paris–Tours, and he would later place eighth in the same race in 1908 and seventh in 1911. He also earned a podium in the 1908 Paris–Roubaix, finishing in second place. That same year, he placed eighth in Bordeaux–Paris a long-distance race over 560 km.

Lorgeou also competed in Italy's premier classics. In 1906, he finished 11th in Milan–San Remo, sixth in the Giro di Lombardia and secured the second place in Milano–Modena.

He participated in two editions of the Tour de France. In the inaugural 1903 Tour, he was registered for only a single stage, riding the 268 km Stage 4 from Toulouse to Bordeaux. In the 1908 Tour de France, Lorgeou started the race but had to withdraw during the fifth stage.

He continued competed in cycling as a veteran and participated in the veteran category of the News Carriers' Championship in: 1926 (Paris-Soir, 1 February); 1928 (L'Intransigeant, 30 January) and 1930 (L'Intransigeant, 27 January).

== Major results ==
- 1900
  - (gold) , News Carriers' Tricycle Championship
  - (silver) French National Road Race Championships
- 1901
  - 2nd, 1901 Paris–Tours
- 1903
  - 5th, 1903 Paris–Roubaix
- 1908
  - 2nd, 1908 Paris–Roubaix
  - 8th, 1908 Paris–Tours
  - 8th, Bordeaux-Paris
- 1909
  - 6th, Giro di Lombardia
  - 2nd, Milano–Modena
- 1911
  - 7th, 1911 Paris–Tours
- 1913
  - 10th, 1911 Paris–Tours
