= Paul Armbruster =

French cyclist

Personal information
- Born: 1 January 1885

Cycling career
- Sport: Cycling
- Discipline: Road
- Role: Rider

Professional team
- 1911: Automoto-Persan

Major wins
- Paris–Rouen (1903)

Paul Armbruster (born 1885) was a French road cyclist during the 1900s and early 1910s. He rode professionally with Automoto-Persan. He won in the 1903 Paris–Rouen, participated in the inaugural 1903 Tour de France and 1911 Tour de France, and had top finishes in major road races between 1902 and 1908.

== Career ==
In 1902 he won the bronze medal at the French National Road Race Championships and finished third in Paris–Beaugency. The next year, he won 1903 Paris–Rouen. He also competed in the 1903 Tour de France, the inaugural edition of the Tour de France. In 1904 he had a podium finish in 1904 Paris–Caen. Also in later years he had some notable achievements, including a top-10 finish in an international cycling classic, the seventh place in 1908 Paris–Tours and participated in the 1911 Tour de France.

== Major results ==
1902
(bronze) French National Road Race Championships
3rd Paris–Beaugency

1903
1st Paris–Rouen

1904
2nd Paris–Caen

1908
7th Paris–Tours
