= 1908 Paris–Tours =

Race details
- Dates: 27 September 1908
- Stages: 1
- Distance: 248 km (154 mi)
- Winning time: 8h 40' 30"

Results
	Winner	Omer Beaugendre (FRA)
	Second	Frederic Saillot (FRA)
	Third	François Faber (LUX)

The 1908 Paris–Tours was the fifth edition of the Paris–Tours cycle race and was held on 27 September 1908. The race started in Paris and finished in Tours. The race was won by Omer Beaugendre.

== General classification ==
Final general classification

Rank	Rider	Time
1	Omer Beaugendre (FRA)	8h 40' 30"
2	Frédéric Saillot (FRA)	+ 0"
3	François Faber (LUX)	+ 6' 30"
4	Henri Lignon (FRA)	+ 6' 30"
5	Georges Sérès (FRA)	+ 6' 30"
6	François Beaugendre (FRA)	+ 6' 30"
7	Paul Armbruster (FRA)	+ 6' 30"
8	Georges Lorgeou (FRA)	+ 6' 31"
9	Marcel Godivier (FRA)	+ 6' 31"
10	Georges Tribouillard (FRA)	+ 6' 31"
