= Antony Wattelier =

French cyclist

Personal information
- Full name: Antony Eugène Wattelier
- Nickname: Tourterelle (turtle dove)
- Born: 15 May 1880 Paris, France
- Died: 31 December 1914 (aged 34) Fricourt, France
- Height: 1.64 m (5 ft 5 in)
- Weight: 61 kg (134 lb)

Cycling career
- Sport: Cycling
- Disciplines: Road; Track
- Role: Rider

Professional teams
- 1905: Peugeot–Wolber
- 1906: Alcyon–Dunlop
- 1907: Montabro
- 1908: Nil–Supra
- 1909: Femina Cycles
- 1910–1911: Lenain

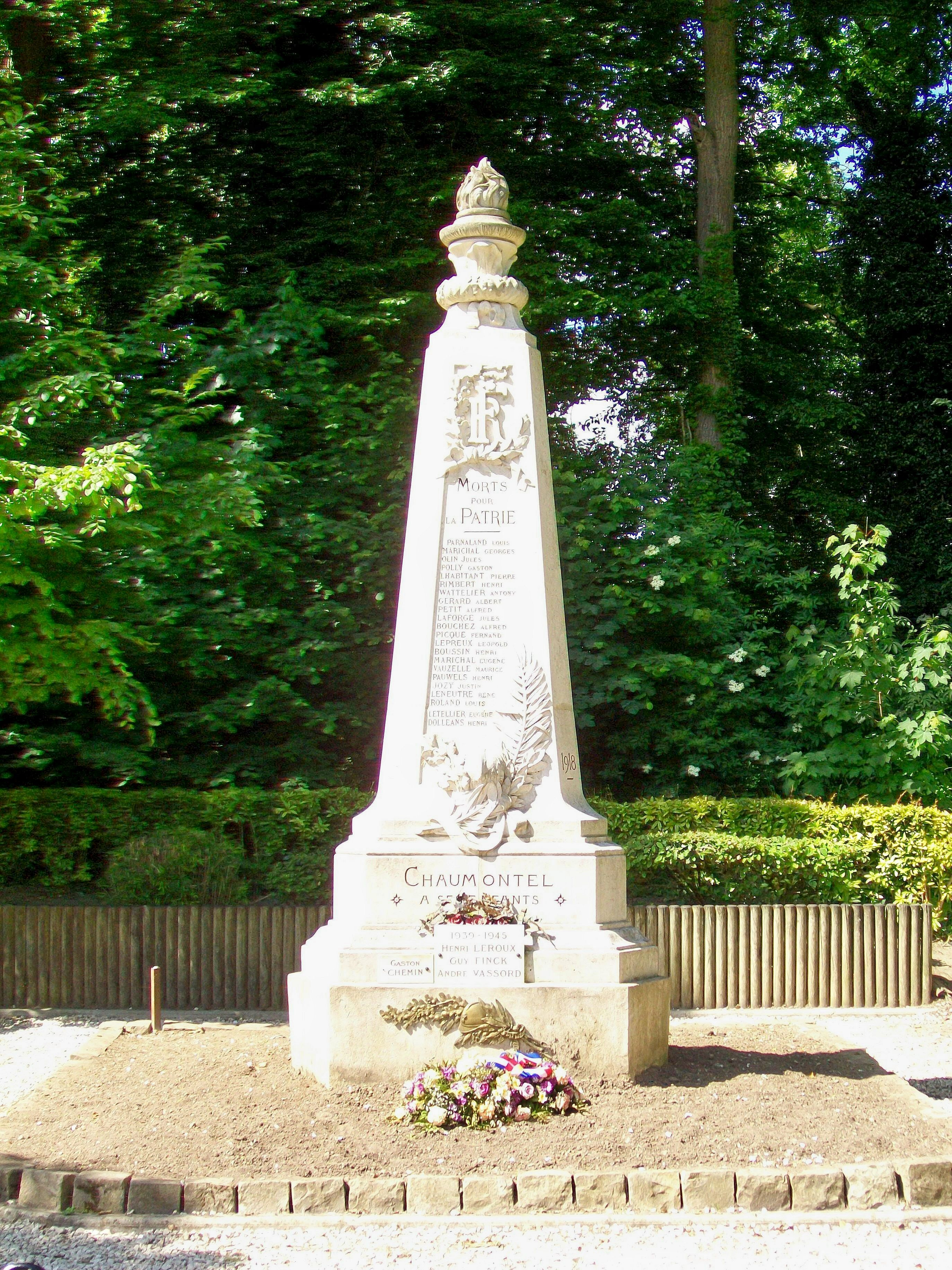
War memorial in Chaumontel, home of his family, including Wattelier

Antony Eugène Wattelier, also known as Antoine Wattelier (15 May 1880 – 31 December 1914) was a French track and road racing cyclist.

== Biography ==
Wattelier was born on 15 May 1880 in Paris. He was the six year younger brother of cyclist Édouard Wattelier. Like his brother, he competed in classic races during the early years of road cycling.

He was a professional cyclist from 1901 until 1913. He was nicknamed tourterelle (turtle dove).

Wattelier participated in the Tour de France seven times; his best result was tenth place in the general classification of the 1906 Tour de France and 15th place at the 1905 Tour de France. In 1901, he placed fourth in Paris–Tours and in 1905 and 1908, he placed 13th and 18th respectively in Paris–Roubaix. At the 1910 Tour de France after dropping out, he remained participating out of competition in the extremely tough mountain stage on 21 July.

In 1906, he was on the podium of the first European six-day racing event. He finished third alongside Georges Landrieu in the six-day race in Toulouse.

Antony Wattelier was killed in action on New Year's Eve 1914 on the Somme at Fricoul while serving as a soldier in World War I.

=== General classification results timeline ===
Grand Tour general classification results
Grand Tour	1905	1906	1907	1908	1909	1910	1911	1912	1913	
Tour de France	15	10	—	31	28	DNF	DNF	—	DNF	
Major one-day and ultra-distance race results
Race	1901	1905	1906	1907	1908	1909	1910	1911	1912	1913
Paris–Roubaix	—	13	—	—	16	24	53	—	—	86
Paris–Tours	4	—	—	—	—	—	—	—	—	—
Paris–Brussels	Not held		—	22	—	—	—	—	—	—
Paris–Brest–Paris	—	Not held						29	Not held	
