= Georges Sérès =

French cyclist

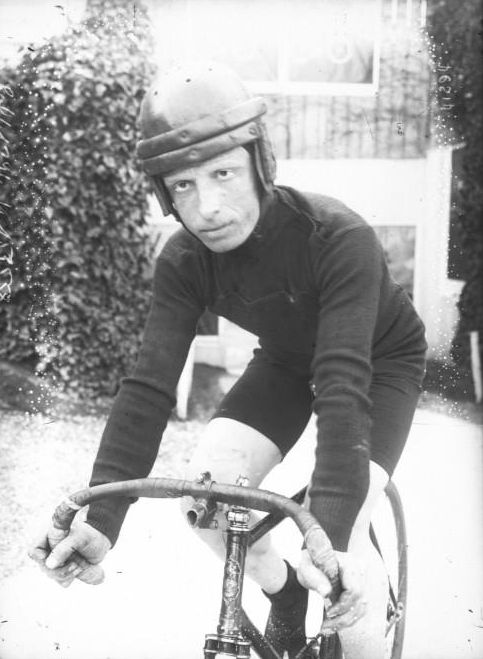

Personal information
- Born: 7 April 1884 Condom, France
- Died: 26 June 1951 (aged 64) Paris, France

Sport
- Sport: Cycling
Medal record
Representing France
UCI Motor-paced World Championships
Gold medal – first place	1920 Antwerp	Professionals
Silver medal – second place	1924 Paris	Professionals
Bronze medal – third place	1925 Amsterdam	Professionals

Georges Sérès (7 April 1884 – 26 June 1951) was a French professional cyclist who mainly specialized in motor-paced racing. In this discipline he won a gold, a silver and a bronze medal at the world championships in 1920, 1924 and 1925, respectively. He crashed in a 1922 race in New Bedford and had 17 fractures after being run over by a pacer.

Still a teenager, he participated in the 1905 and 1906 edition of the Tour de France, but did not manage to finish either of them. In 1908 he achieved a 5th place in the highly regarded classic Paris - Tours.

On the track he also won three six-day races in Paris, in 1921, 1922 and 1924.

His sons Georges and Arthur were also competitive cyclists.
