= Bol d'Or cycle race =

Historic pedal cycle in France

Bol d'Or
Race details
- Region: Paris, France; 1898: Roubaix; 1925: Bordeaux
- English name: The Golden Bowl
- Discipline: Track
- Type: 24-hour endurance race

History
- First edition: 1894
- Editions: 25
- Final edition: 1950
- First winner: Constant Huret (FRA)
- Most wins: Léon Georget (FRA) (9)
- Final winner: Fiorenzo Magni (ITA)

The Bol d'Or was a bicycle track race that ran in France between 1894 and 1950. It was a paced, 24-hour endurance event. It has been won by several notable cyclists including Constant Huret (4 times), the Australian Hubert Opperman and three time hour record breaker Oscar Egg. The person with the most wins is Léon Georget (brother of Émile) with nine (including eight in a row).

== Origins ==
In the nineteenth century, English and French cyclists were trying to get the world record for 24 hours cycling. Usually, the English cyclists had the record, but in 1892 a French cyclist (Auguste Stéphane) broke the record, riding 631 km. The English cyclists organized a cycling event a few days later, and in that race they took back the record when Frank Shorland rode 665 km. The record changed hands a few more times during irregularly scheduled competitions, but in 1894 the French created the Bol d'Or so they would have a yearly go at the record.

The race was created on 23 and 24 June 1894 by a Monsieur Decam. It first ran at the Vélodrome Buffalo in Paris and was sponsored by Chocolate Meunier.

The race gets its name from the prize awarded to the winner - a gilded bronze bowl or cup.

== Rules ==
During the Bol d'Or, riders had 24 hours to ride as many laps as possible. The riders were helped by pacers; details of the pacing changed over the years. In 1899, electric tandems were tried, which resulted in a record distance. In 1902, riders were only paced in the first two and last two hours, which resulted in a lower distance.

In the early years riders were paced by tandems or triplets. Motor (derny) pacing was used in 1950. The 1900 event was one of the cycling events during the 1900 Summer Olympics, but it is not considered an Olympic event by the IOC because professional cyclists were allowed to enter.

== Winners ==
Year	Rider	Country	Distance	Pacing	Velodrome
1894	Constant Huret	France	736.946 km	tandem paced	Vélodrome Buffalo
1895	Constant Huret	France	829.498 km	tandem paced	Vélodrome Buffalo
1896	Gaston Rivierre	France	859.120 km	tandem paced	Vélodrome Buffalo
1897	Lucien Stein	France	764.826 km	tandem paced	Vélodrome Buffalo
1898	Constant Huret	France	852.468 km	triplet paced	Roubaix Vélodrome
1899	Albert Walters	Great Britain	1020.977 km	electric tandem paced	Parc des Princes Vélodrome
1900	Mathieu Cordang	Netherlands	956.775 km	triplet paced	Vélodrome de Vincennes
1902	Constant Huret	France	779.488 km	tandem paced	Vélodrome Buffalo
1903	Léon Georget	France	847.803 km	tandem paced	Vélodrome Buffalo
1904	Lucien Petit-Breton	France	852.000 km	tandem paced	Vélodrome Buffalo
1905	Arthur Vanderstuyft	Belgium	943.666 km	tandem paced	Vélodrome d'hiver
1906	René Pottier	France	925.290 km	tandem paced	Vélodrome Buffalo
1907	Léon Georget	France	904.420 km	tandem paced	Vélodrome Buffalo
1908	Léon Georget	France	973.666 km	tandem paced	Vélodrome d'hiver
1909	Léon Georget	France	845.700 km	tandem paced	Vélodrome Buffalo
1910	Léon Georget	France	923.300 km	tandem paced	Vélodrome Buffalo
1911	Léon Georget	France	915.160 km	tandem paced	Vélodrome Buffalo
1912	Léon Georget	France	951.750 km	tandem paced	Vélodrome d'hiver
1913	Léon Georget	France	909.984 km	tandem paced	Vélodrome d'hiver
1919	Léon Georget	France	924.680 km	tandem paced	Vélodrome d'hiver
1924	Oscar Egg	Switzerland	936.325 km	tandem paced	Vélodrome Buffalo
1925	Honoré Barthélémy	France	1035.114 km	tandem paced	Bordeaux Vélodrome
1927	Honoré Barthélémy	France	924.500 km	tandem paced	Vélodrome Buffalo
1928	Hubert Opperman	Australia	950.060 km	tandem paced	Vélodrome Buffalo
1950	Fiorenzo Magni	Italy	867.609 km	derny paced	Vélodrome d'hiver
