= Firmin Pauloin =

French cyclist

Personal information
- Born: 14 January 1876
- Died: 7 August 1940 (aged 64)

Cycling career
- Sport: Cycling
- Role: Rider

Firmin Pauloin (14 January 1876 – 7 August 1940) was a French racing cyclist. He rode in the 1920 Tour de France.
