= Bossay-sur-Claise =

Bossay sur Claise
- Commune
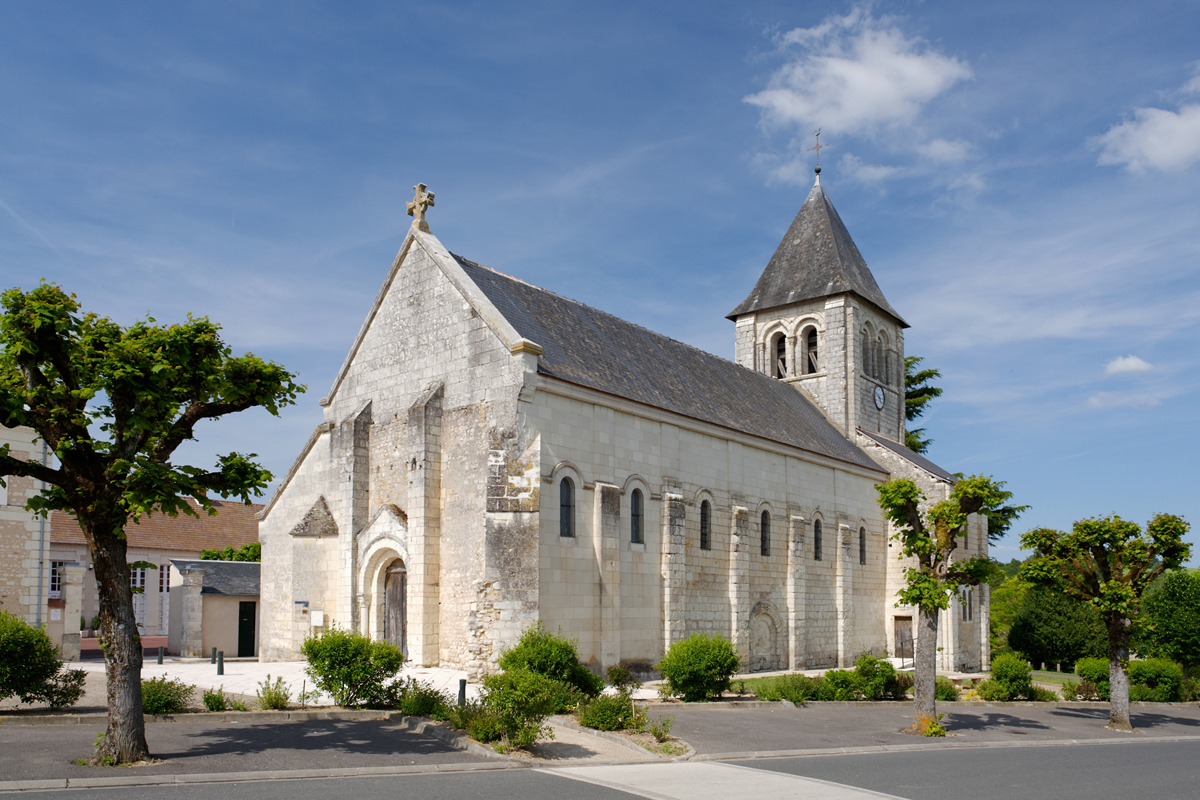
- The church of Saint-Martin, in Bossay-sur-Claise

- Coat of arms
- Location of Bossay sur Claise
- Location within France Location within Centre-Val de Loire
- Coordinates: 46°49′59″N 0°57′47″E
- Country: France
- Region: Centre-Val de Loire
- Department: Indre-et-Loire
- Arrondissement: Loches
- Canton: Descartes
- Intercommunality: CC Loches Sud Touraine

Government
  - Mayor (2020–2026): Alain Guérin
- Area^{1}: 65.56 km^{2} (25.31 sq mi)
- Highest elevation: 144 m (472 ft)
- Lowest elevation: 67 m (220 ft)
- Population (2023): 733
  - Density: 11.2/km^{2} (29.0/sq mi)
- Time zone: UTC+01:00 (CET)
  - Summer (DST): UTC+02:00 (CEST)
- INSEE/Postal code: 37028 /37290
- ^{1} French Land Register data, which excludes lakes, ponds, glaciers > 1 km^{2} (0.386 sq mi or 247 acres) and river estuaries.

Bossay-sur-Claise (French pronunciation: [bɔsɛ syʁ klɛz]) is a commune in the Indre-et-Loire department in central France.

== Population ==
Historical population
| Year | Pop. | ±% p.a. |
|---|---|---|
| 1968 | 1,192 | — |
| 1975 | 1,038 | −1.96% |
| 1982 | 915 | −1.79% |
| 1990 | 867 | −0.67% |
| 1999 | 787 | −1.07% |
| 2007 | 823 | +0.56% |
| 2012 | 796 | −0.66% |
| 2017 | 758 | −0.97% |
| 2023 | 733 | −0.56% |
Source: INSEE

== See also ==
- Communes of the Indre-et-Loire department
