= Georges Bronchard =

French cyclist

Personal information
- Full name: Georges Bronchard
- Born: 21 January 1887 Saint-Mammès, France
- Died: 27 April 1918 (aged 31) Villers-sur-Coudun, France

Cycling career
- Sport: Cycling
- Role: Rider

Georges Bronchard (21 January 1887 – 27 April 1918) was a French racing cyclist. He finished in last place in the 1906 Tour de France. He was killed during World War I.
