= Georges Fleury =

French cyclist

Personal information
- Full name: Georges Fleury
- Born: 18 February 1878 Orléans, France
- Died: 10 March 1968 (aged 90) Créteil, France
- Height: 1.6 m (5 ft 3 in)
- Weight: 64 kg (141 lb; 10 st 1 lb)

Cycling career
- Sport: Cycling
- Discipline: Road
- Role: Rider

Professional teams
- 1904: Peugeot
- 1906: Rochet
- 1908: Peugeot–Wolber
- 1909–1911: Le Globe

Georges Fleury (18 February 1878 – 10 March 1968) was a French professional racing cyclist who last rode for the Le Globe team.

Fleury was named on the startlist for 7 Tour de France editions, managing to finish 5 of them including one in the top ten of the general classification at the 1908 Tour de France.

== Major results ==
1904
3rd Bordeaux–Paris
1906
7th Bordeaux–Paris
10th Paris–Roubaix
1908
7th Overall Tour de France
1909
3rd Paris–Calais
1910
6th Bordeaux–Paris

=== Grand Tour general classification results timeline ===
Grand Tour	1904	1905	1906	1907	1908	1909	1910	1911
Giro d'Italia	Did not Exist					—	—	—
Tour de France	DNF	—	11	12	7	12	23	DNF

Legend
—	Did not compete
DNF	Did not finish
