= 1906 Tour de France =

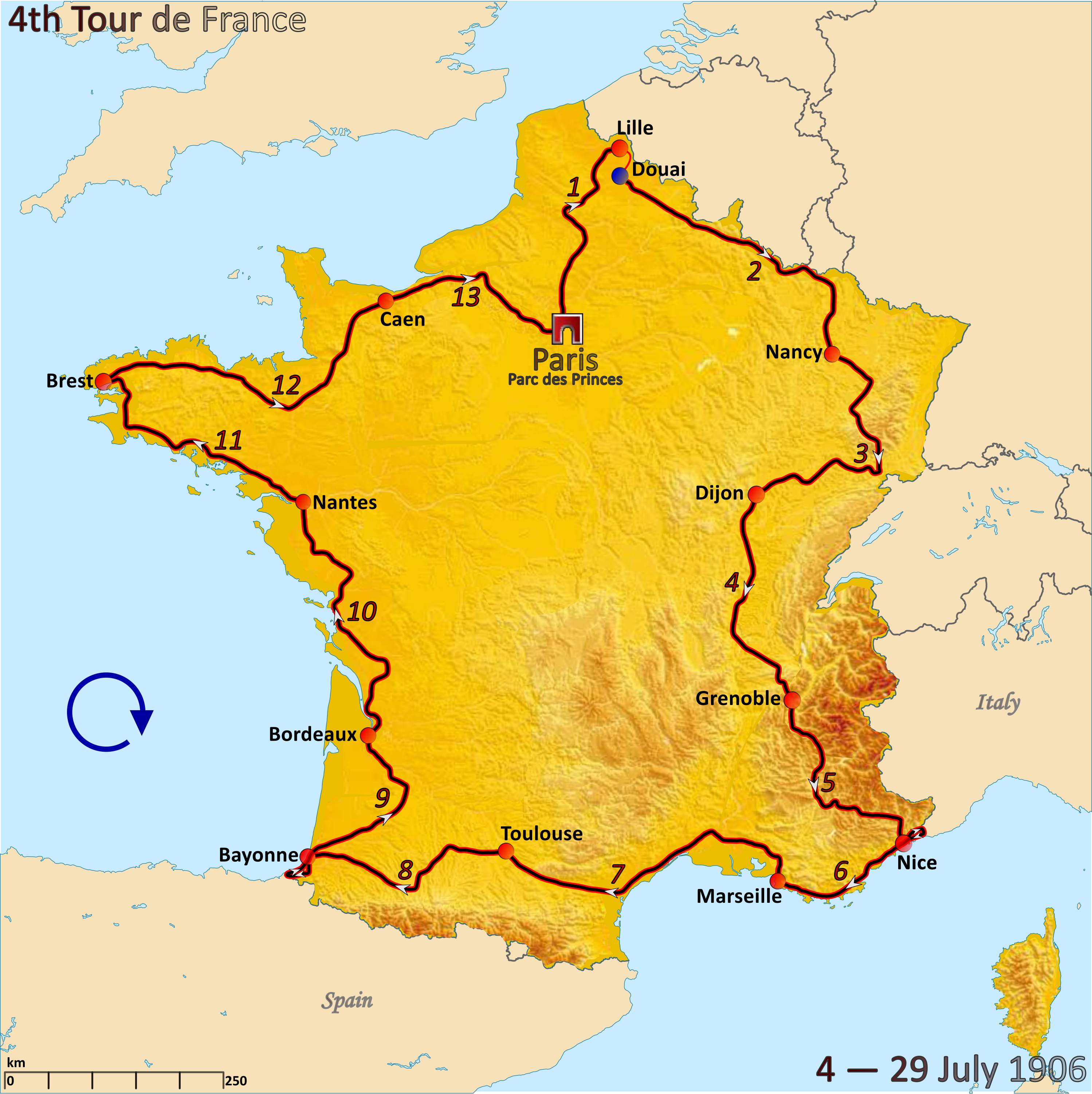
- Route of the 1906 Tour de France followed clockwise, starting in Paris

Race details
- Dates: 4–29 July 1906
- Stages: 13
- Distance: 4,637 km (2,881 mi)
- Winning time: 31 points

Results
	Winner	René Pottier (FRA)
	Second	Georges Passerieu (FRA)
	Third	Louis Trousselier (FRA)

The 1906 Tour de France was the fourth edition of the Tour de France, and the second to use the points system. Taking place from 4 to 29 July, the total race distance was 4,637 kilometres (2,881 mi) run over 13 stages, with the winner averaging 24.463 kilometres per hour (15.201 mph). New to this year's edition were the mountain climbs in the Massif Central. However, like its predecessors, cheating and sabotage still took place. Four competitors were disqualified for taking trains as a shortcut and spectators threw nails on the road. However, this did not stop René Pottier from taking a big lead in the first stages. Free of the tendinitis that had plagued his 1905 chances, he dominated the entire race.

== Innovations and changes ==
Tour organiser Henri Desgrange had been happy with the increased length of the 1905 Tour de France, and decided to put even more stages in the 1906 version.

The introduction of mountain stages had also been successful, so this edition included not only the Vosges, but also the Massif Central.

The increased length made it possible to follow the borders of France, and in 1906 the perimeter was closely followed.

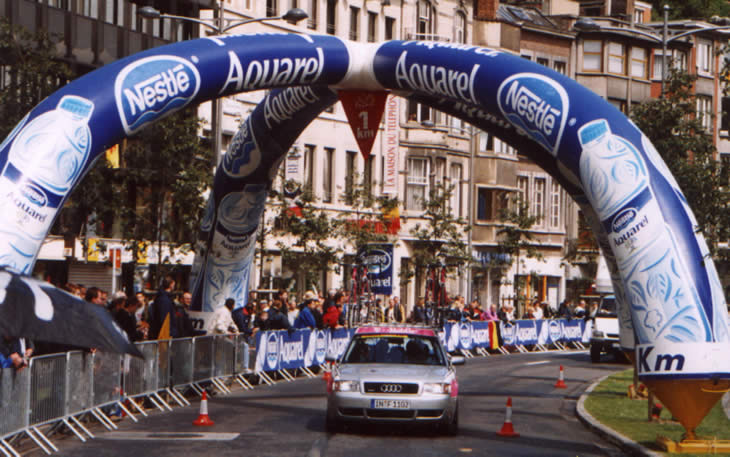
The flamme rouge, indicating the final kilometre of the stage, was introduced in the 1906 Tour de France.

The points system in the 1905 Tour de France had been successful enough in reducing cheating, so the Tour organisers used it again in the 1906 Tour de France, with a few changes: whereas in 1905, time differences still had some effect on the points distribution, in 1906 time differences were unimportant, and points were only given for the order in which the cyclists finished. The winner of the stage received one point, the second rider two points, et cetera. After the eighth stage, only 16 cyclists were remaining, and the results from the first eight stages were recalculated, with only the remaining cyclists, and the points were redistributed among the remaining riders in accordance with their positions in those stages.

The first stage ended in Lille and the second stage started in Douai; this was the first time that a stage did not start where the previous stage ended. And, for the first time, the Tour also went outside France. The second stage crossed the border into Germany (Metz in Alsace-Lorraine, then part of Germany), and several days later riders visited Italy (Ventimiglia) and Spain (Irun).

The 1906 Tour also saw the introduction of the flamme rouge (red flame), a red flag that indicates that the cyclists only have one kilometre to go.

== Participants ==
There were 100 cyclists signed up for the race, but only 76 of them came to the start. One of the absentees was Henri Cornet, winner of the 1904 Tour de France. Four cyclists were Belgian, one was Luxembourgian (later winner François Faber), two were German, and the rest were French. Louis Trousselier, winner of the 1905 Tour de France, was present. The riders were not grouped in teams, but some cyclists had the same sponsor, even though they were not allowed to work together. Before the race started, most was expected from Cadolle, Aucouturier, Georget, Pottier, Trousselier, Dortignac and Petit-Breton.

As in 1905, the cyclists were divided in two categories, the coureurs de vitesse and the coureurs sur machines poinçonnées, where the riders in the first category were allowed to change bicycles, which could be an advantage in the mountains, where they could use a bicycle with lower gears. In 1905, sponsors had not been so enthusiastic about entering their cyclists in this category, but in 1906 they had learned that it had a commercial advantage to have cyclists starting in the poinçonnées category, because the average French citizen could identify more with them. In 1906, more than half of the cyclists started in the poinçonnées category, including Lucien Petit-Breton, one of the pre-favourites.

== Race overview ==
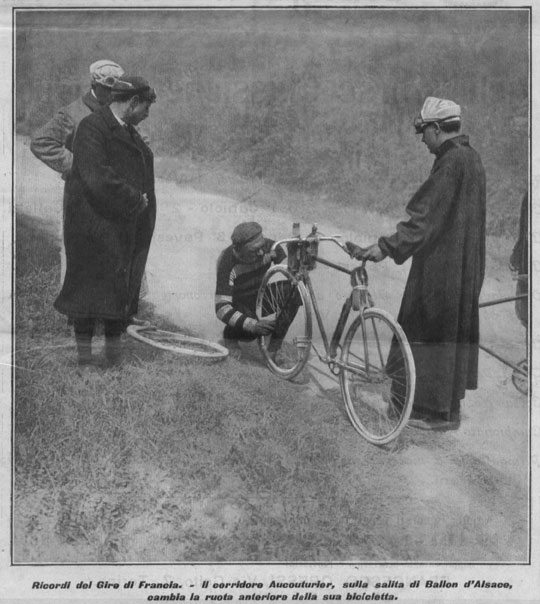
Hippolyte Aucouturier fixing a flat tire

As in previous years, the spectators tried to assist their preferred riders by trying to impede their opponents. On the first stage, nails had been thrown on the road, and all cyclists except Lucien Petit-Breton punctured. This stage was won by Emile Georget in a sprint.

In the second stage, René Pottier, who had shown his climbing abilities in the previous edition, aimed for the victory. He was stopped after 175 kilometres (109 mi) with mechanical failure, and he lost 58 minutes. The other main contenders worked together to stay away from Pottier, but Pottier chased them for 200 kilometres (120 mi), caught them 25 kilometres (16 mi) before the finish, and even left them behind, winning the stage with a margin of 1'30" on Petit-Breton and more than 9 minutes on the rest.

In the third stage, four cyclists (Julien Gabory, Henri Gauban, Gaston Tuvache and Maurice Carrere) were disqualified for taking the train. The Ballon d'Alsace, which had been the first real mountain in the Tour de France the previous year, was featured again. Just as the year before, it was mounted first by Pottier. The stage was also won by Pottier, more than 45 minutes ahead of the rest.

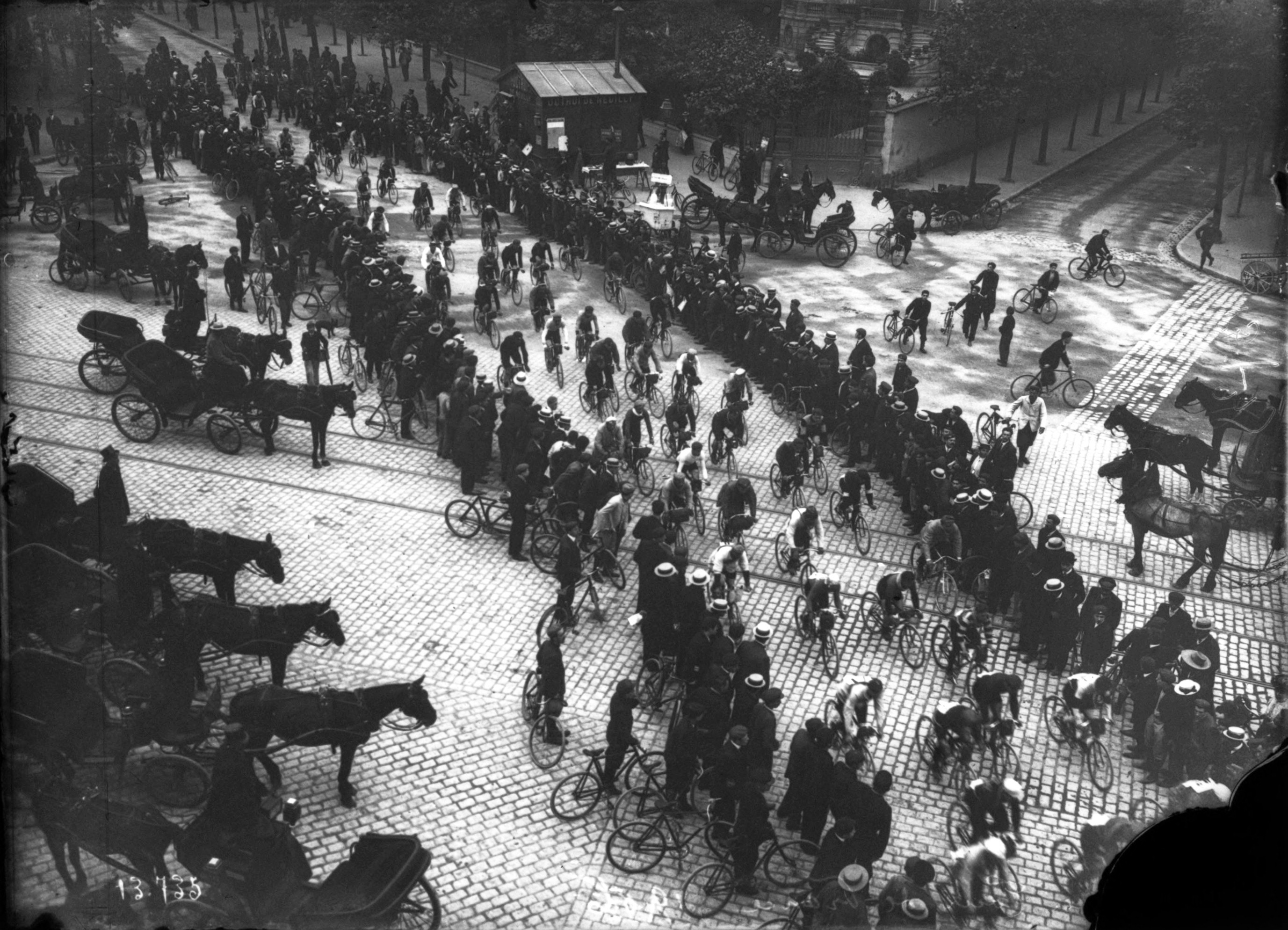
The 1906 Tour passing through a town

Pottier also won the fourth stage. In the fifth stage, he was leading by one hour at the halfway point. A cycling legend says that he decided to stop, entered a bar and ordered a bottle of wine, and drank it almost completely. When he saw the first other cyclists passing by, Pottier mounted his bicycle again, went after them, and won the stage. By this point, Pottier was leading the overall classification firmly. The winner of the 1905 Tour de France, Louis Trousselier, had had a bad first half of the Tour, and was many points behind. Trousselier rediscovered his form in the second half of the race, won the 7th, 9th, 10th and 11th stages, and was challenging the second place of Georges Passerieu. Passerieu defended his position by winning the 12th stage. In the last stage, Pottier showed his strength by winning the stage, after finishing together in Paris with Passerieu.

== Results ==
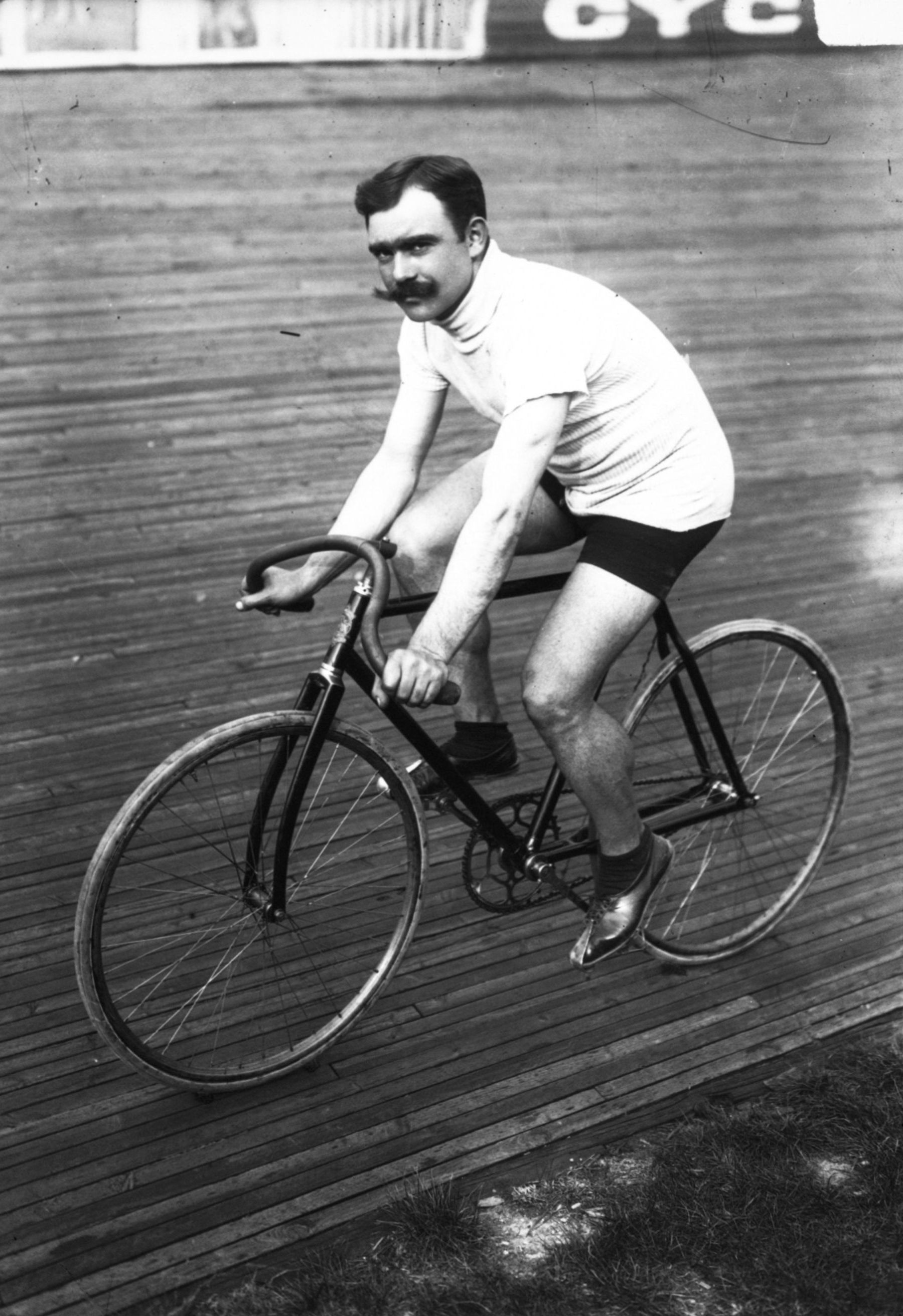
Louis Trousselier, winner of four stages in the 1906 Tour de France.

=== Stage results ===
Stage characteristics and winners
Stage	Date	Course	Distance	Type (Note: In 1906, there was no distinction in the rules between plain stages and mountain stages; the icons shown here indicate that only the third and fifth stage included mountains.)	Winner	Race leader
1	4 July	Paris to Lille	275 km (171 mi)	Plain stage	Emile Georget (FRA)	Emile Georget (FRA)
2	6 July	Douai to Nancy	400 km (250 mi)	Plain stage	René Pottier (FRA)	René Pottier (FRA)
3	8 July	Nancy to Dijon	416 km (258 mi)	Stage with mountain(s)	René Pottier (FRA)	René Pottier (FRA)
4	10 July	Dijon to Grenoble	311 km (193 mi)	Plain stage	René Pottier (FRA)	René Pottier (FRA)
5	12 July	Grenoble to Nice	345 km (214 mi)	Stage with mountain(s)	René Pottier (FRA)	René Pottier (FRA)
6	14 July	Nice to Marseille	292 km (181 mi)	Plain stage	Georges Passerieu (FRA)	René Pottier (FRA)
7	16 July	Marseille to Toulouse	480 km (300 mi)	Plain stage	Louis Trousselier (FRA)	René Pottier (FRA)
8	18 July	Toulouse to Bayonne	300 km (190 mi)	Plain stage	Jean-Baptiste Dortignacq (FRA)	René Pottier (FRA)
9	20 July	Bayonne to Bordeaux	338 km (210 mi)	Plain stage	Louis Trousselier (FRA)	René Pottier (FRA)
10	22 July	Bordeaux to Nantes	391 km (243 mi)	Plain stage	Louis Trousselier (FRA)	René Pottier (FRA)
11	24 July	Nantes to Brest	321 km (199 mi)	Plain stage	Louis Trousselier (FRA)	René Pottier (FRA)
12	26 July	Brest to Caen	415 km (258 mi)	Plain stage	Georges Passerieu (FRA)	René Pottier (FRA)
13	29 July	Caen to Paris	259 km (161 mi)	Plain stage	René Pottier (FRA)	René Pottier (FRA)
	Total		4,637 km (2,881 mi)			

After the 13th stage, the race was followed by two timed exhibition laps on the Velodrome in Paris, the result of which was not counted for the overall classification. The winner was Emile Georget, who finished the 1,332 metres (4,370 ft) in 2:07.20.

=== General classification ===
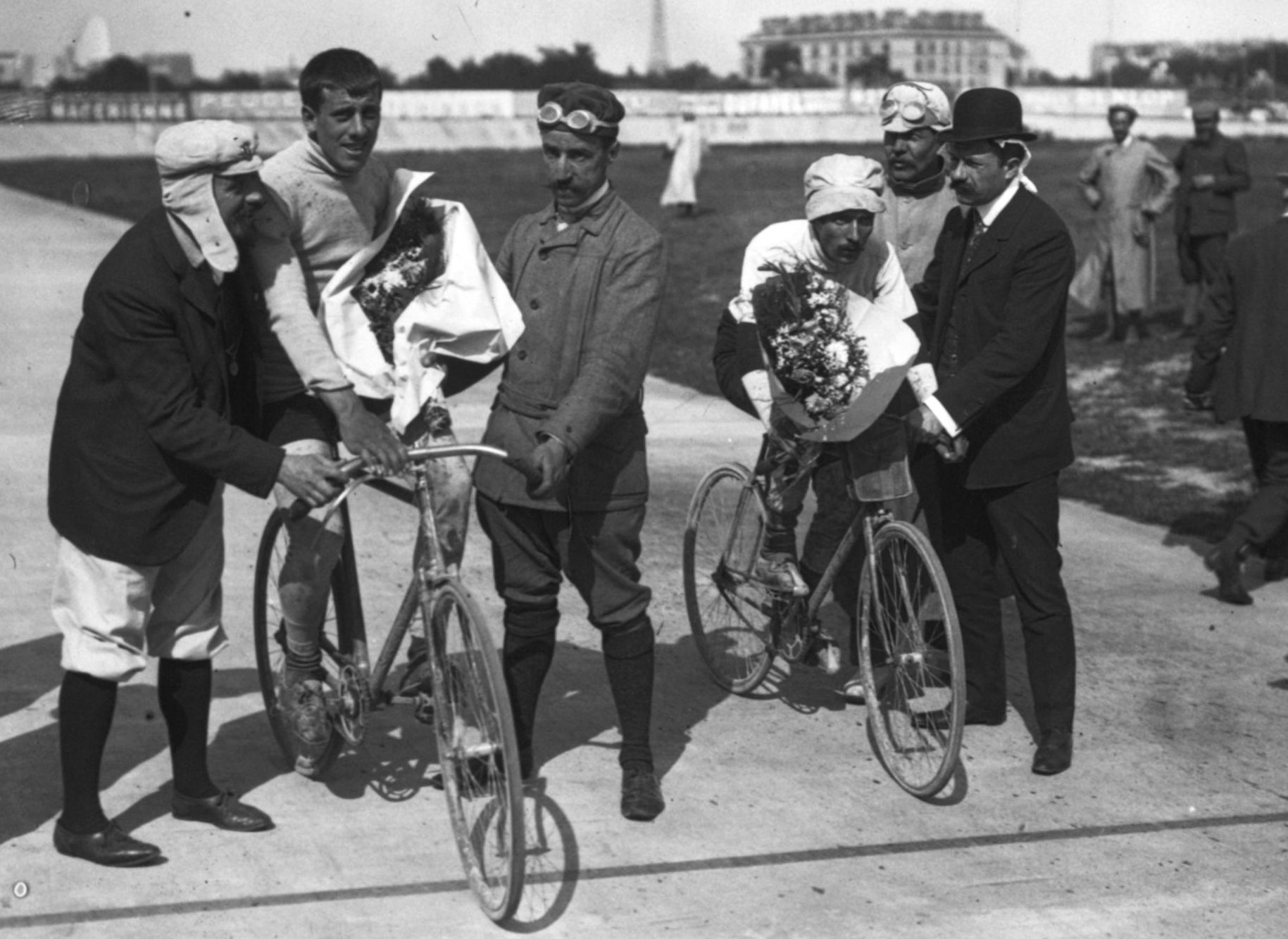
Georges Passerieu (left) and René Pottier (right), preparing for their honorary lap after the Tour ended.

One hundred cyclists had entered for the 1906 Tour de France; only 82 of them showed up at the start. Only 49 cyclists finished the first stage, and the number of active cyclists quickly fell to 37 in stage two, 29 in stage three, until 16 after stage eight. At that point, the points given in the first eight stages were redistributed among the remaining riders in accordance with their positions in those stages. At the end of the Tour de France, only 14 cyclists finished. The cyclists were not grouped in teams; some cyclists had the same sponsor, but they were not allowed to work together.

Final general classification (1–10)
Rank	Rider	Sponsor	Points
1	René Pottier (FRA)	Peugeot	31
2	Georges Passerieu (FRA)	Peugeot	39
3	Louis Trousselier (FRA)	Peugeot	61
4	Lucien Petit-Breton (FRA)	Peugeot	65
5	Emile Georget (FRA)	Alcyon–Dunlop	80
6	Aloïs Catteau (BEL)	Alcyon–Dunlop	129
7	Édouard Wattelier (FRA)	Labor	137
8	Léon Georget (FRA)	Alcyon–Dunlop	152
9	Eugène Christophe (FRA)	Labor	156
10	Anthony Wattelier (FRA)	Alcyon–Dunlop	168

Final general classification (11–14)
Rank	Rider	Sponsor	Points
11	Georges Fleury (FRA)	Rochet	201
12	Ferdinand Payan (FRA)	Chapmeyrache/MIC Cycles	222
13	Léon Winant (FRA)	—	241
14	Georges Bronchard (FRA)	Biguet	256

=== Other classifications ===
Lucien Petit-Breton was the winner of the "machines poinçonnées" category.

The organising newspaper l'Auto named René Pottier the meilleur grimpeur. This unofficial title is the precursor to the mountains classification.

== Aftermath ==
The Tour organisers did not make many changes the rules or route for the next race, because they had worked in the 1906 Tour de France. The revised points system would be kept in this form until 1911, only to be changed a little bit in 1912 before being replaced by the time system in 1913. The flamme rouge that was introduced in 1906 to indicate the final kilometre of a stage was kept and is still in use.

René Pottier would not defend his title in the 1907 Tour de France, because he would commit suicide before, after discovering that his wife had had an affair while he was riding the Tour. Petit-Breton and Georget would start again in the 1907 Tour and duel for the overall victory, which would be won by Petit-Breton.

To honor Pottier's achievements on the Ballon d'Alsace, a monument was placed for him on top of that mountain.

== Bibliography ==
- Amels, Wim (1984). De geschiedenis van de Tour de France 1903–1984 (in Dutch). Valkenswaard, Netherlands: Sport-Express. ISBN 978-90-70763-05-3.
- Augendre, Jacques (2016). "Guide historique" [Historical guide] (PDF). Tour de France (in French). Paris: Amaury Sport Organisation. Archived (PDF) from the original on 17 August 2016.
- Cleijne, Jan (2014). Legends of the Tour. London: Head of Zeus. ISBN 978-1-78185-998-8.
- McGann, Bill; McGann, Carol (2006). The Story of the Tour de France: 1903–1964. Vol. 1. Indianapolis, IN: Dog Ear Publishing. ISBN 978-1-59858-180-5.
- Thompson, Christopher S. (2006). The Tour de France: A Cultural History. Oakland, CA: University of California Press. ISBN 978-0-520-24760-4.
