= Édouard Wattelier =

French cyclist

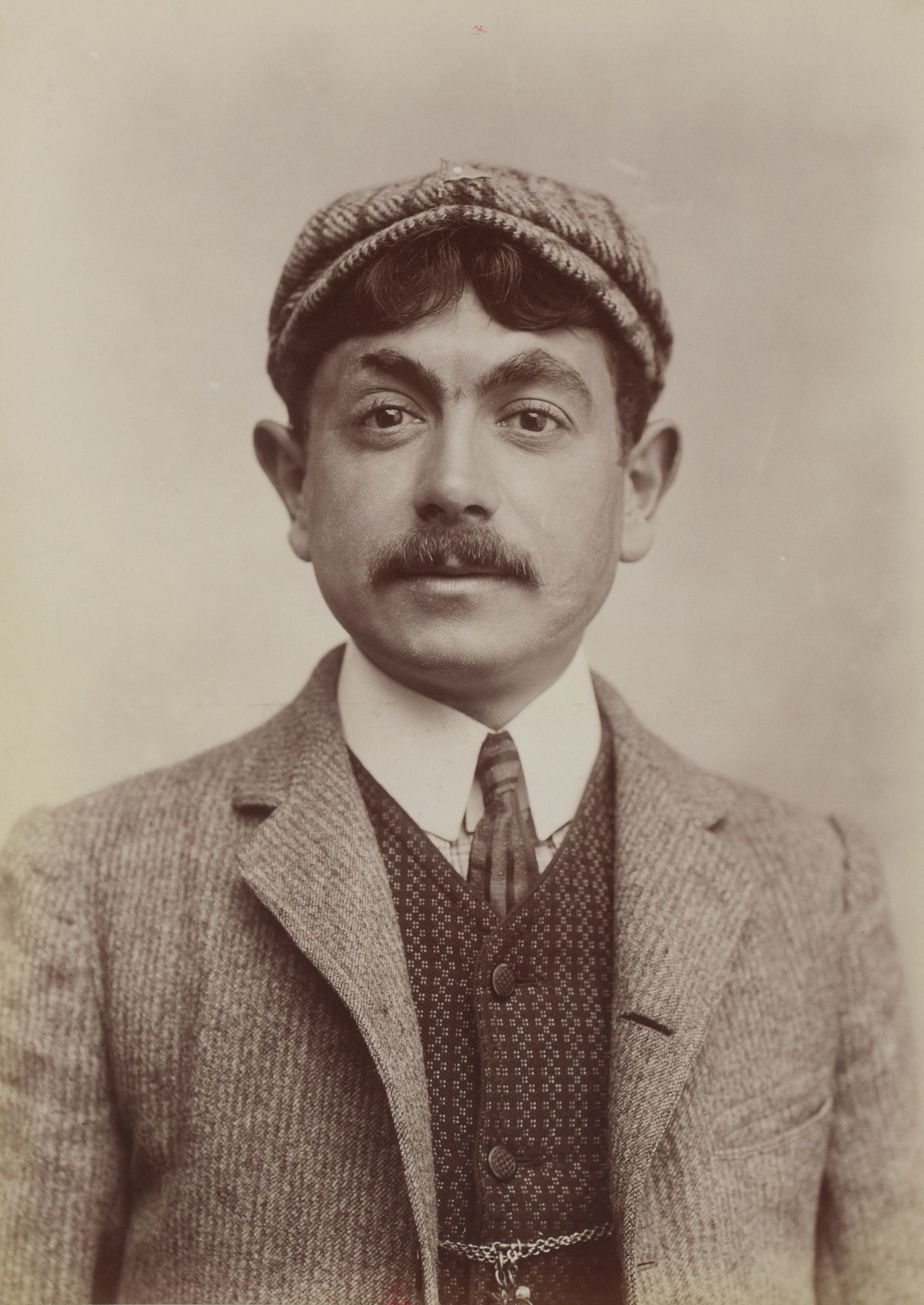

Personal information
- Born: 12 December 1876 Chaumontel, France
- Died: 18 September 1957 (aged 80) Chaumontel, France

Cycling career
- Sport: Cycling
- Discipline: Road
- Role: Rider

Édouard Wattelier (12 December 1876 – 18 September 1957) was a French racing cyclist. He finished third in the 1898 Paris–Roubaix, eighth in the 1901 Paris–Roubaix and second in the 1902 Paris–Roubaix. He also won the 1902 Bordeaux–Paris and finished seventh in the 1906 Tour de France.

His younger brother Antony was also a professional cyclist.
