= Léon Georget =

French cyclist (1879-1949)

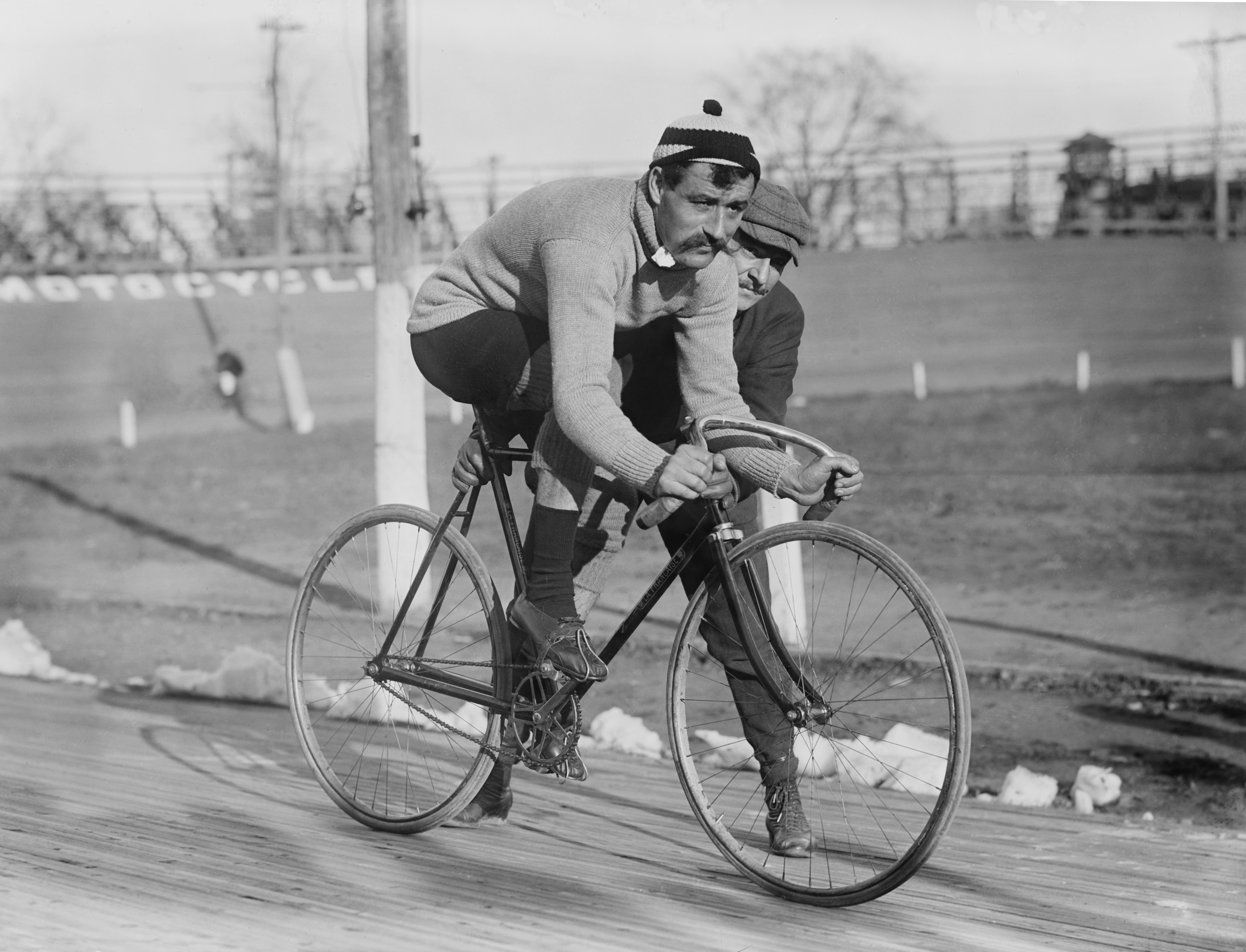

Personal information
- Full name: Léon Georget
- Nicknames: Le Père Bol d'Or (The Father of the Bol d'Or); Gros Rouge (Big Red); Le Brutal (The Brute)
- Born: 2 October 1879 Preuilly-sur-Claise, France
- Died: 5 November 1949 (aged 70) Neuilly-sur-Seine, France

Cycling career
- Sport: Cycling
- Disciplines: Road and track
- Role: Rider

Professional teams
- 1903: –
- 1911: –
- 1924: –

Major wins
- Bordeaux–Paris 1903, 1910, Bol d'Or 9 times, 1903, 1907, 1908, 1909, 1910, 1911, 1912, 1913, 1919

Léon Georget (2 October 1879 – 5 November 1949) was a racing cyclist from Preuilly-sur-Claise, Indre-et-Loire, France. He was known as The Father of the Bol d'Or, having won the race nine times between 1903 and 1919 in Paris. He was also nicknamed Big Red or The Brute.

Léon's younger brother Émile was also a very successful cyclist, winning the Bordeaux–Paris and nine stages of the Tour de France. His son Pierre Georget won silver (1000 metres) and bronze medals (tandem) at the 1936 Summer Olympics.

== Major results ==
- Bol d'Or 1903 1st
- Bol d'Or 1904 2nd
- Bol d'Or 1906 3rd
- Bol d'Or 1907 1st
- Bol d'Or 1908 1st
- Bol d'Or 1909 1st
- Bol d'Or 1910 1st
- Bol d'Or 1911 1st
- Bol d'Or 1912 1st
- Bol d'Or 1913 1st
- Bol d'Or 1919 1st
- Bol d'Or 1924 6th
- Brussels 24 hours, 1906 1st Tandem with Émile
- Six Days Toulouse: 1906 1st (with Émile)
- Bordeaux–Paris: 1903 2nd
- Bordeaux–Paris: 1910 3rd
- Six Days New York: 1907 3rd (teamed with Émile in 1906, 1909 and 1911)
- Tour de France: 1906 8th
