= Louis Trousselier =

French cyclist

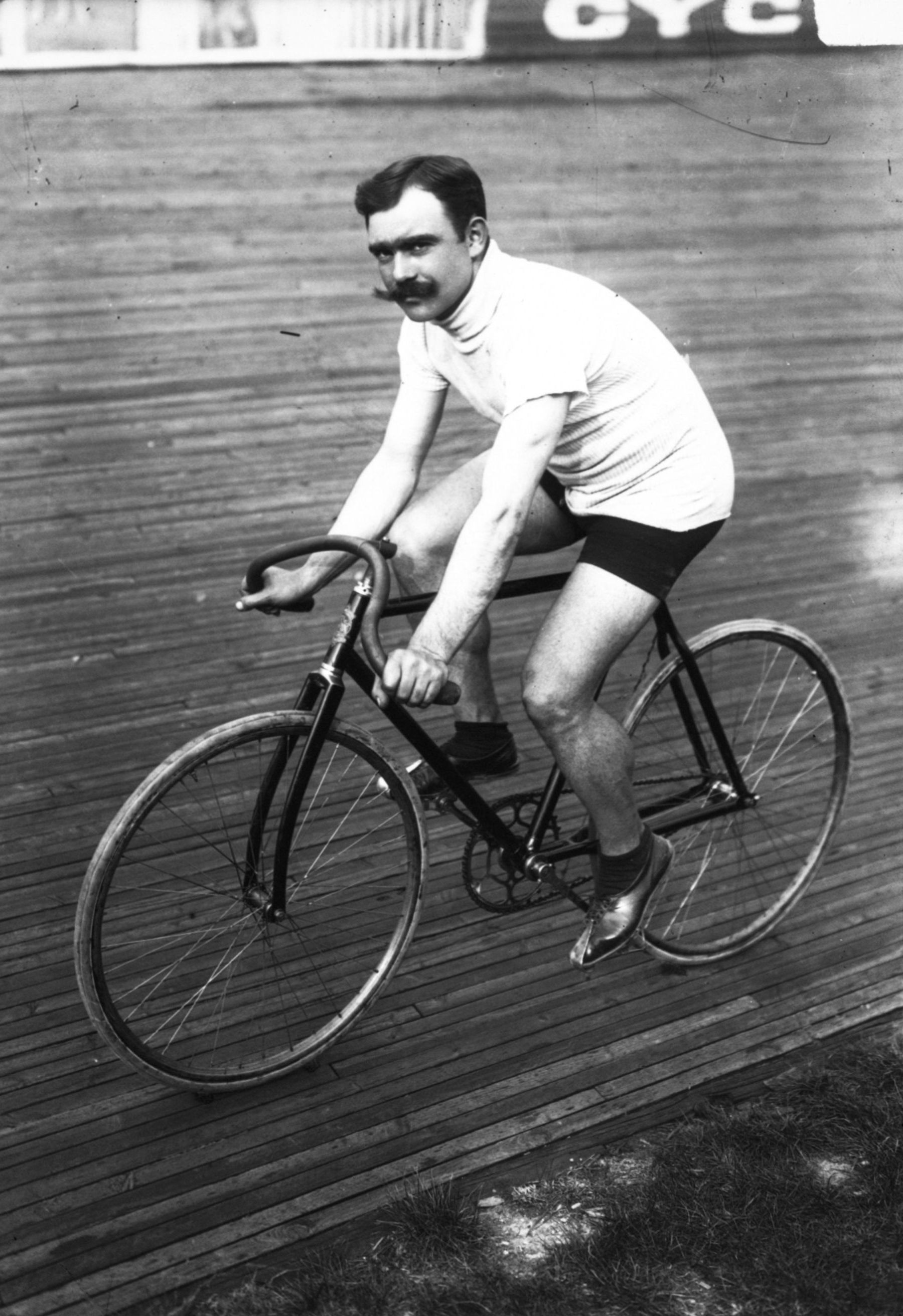

Personal information
- Full name: Louis Trousselier
- Nicknames: Levaloy; Trou-trou
- Born: 29 June 1881 Paris, France
- Died: 24 April 1939 (aged 57) Paris, France

Cycling career
- Sport: Cycling
- Discipline: Road
- Role: Rider

Major wins
- Grand Tours Tour de France General classification (1905) 13 individual stages (1905-1907, 1909, 1910) One-day races and Classics Paris–Roubaix (1905) Brussels–Roubaix (1905) Bordeaux–Paris (1908)
Medal record
Olympic Games
Bronze medal – third place	1900 Paris	points race

Louis Trousselier (French pronunciation: [lwi tʁu.sɛlje]; 1881 – 24 April 1939) was a French racing cyclist who won the 1905 Tour de France. His other major wins were Paris–Roubaix, also in 1905, and the 1908 Bordeaux–Paris. He came third in the 1906 Tour de France and won 13 stages of the Tour de France over his career. He also competed in the men's 25 kilometres event at the 1900 Summer Olympics and won a bronze medal in the Men's points race.

== Biography ==
Trousselier was born on 29 June 1881 in Paris. Nicknamed Trou-Trou, he came from a rich family which had a flower business in central Paris. For that reason, when Henri Desgrange, the first organiser of the Tour, sought to popularise competitors by giving them nicknames, he referred to Trousselier as "the florist".

Trousselier's brothers Léopold and André were also cyclists.

After competing in the 1900 Summer Olympics, Trousselier turned professional and rode his first professional race during Christmas 1900.

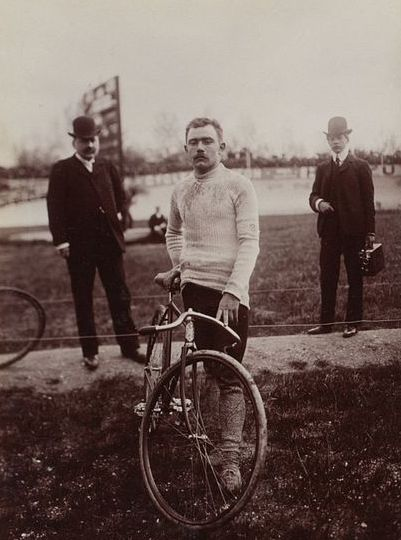
Trousselier in 1903 at Bordeaux–Paris. Trousselier finished that race in second place, but would later be disqualified.

In 1903, Louis Trousselier rode Bordeaux–Paris, which was his first long race. He finished in second place, behind Hippolyte Aucouturier. However, a few days later he was disqualified, because he had taken shelter behind a car during the race. When the newspaper that organized Bordeaux–Paris organized the first Tour de France later that year, Trousselier was still banned.

He rode his first Tour de France in 1905, taking a few days' official leave from his service as a soldier and depending on doing well to save himself from too strong a penalty - potentially as a deserter - when he got back much later. He dominated the race winning five stages, completing the 3,021 km in 110 hours 26 minutes and 58 second at an average speed of 27.48 km. He won with 35 points ahead of Hippolyte Aucouturier (61 pts) and Jean-Baptiste Dortignacq (64pts). Victory brought him all his prizes, contracts to ride all over France and a bonus from his sponsor. But that night, in a trackside cabin in Paris, he lost the whole lot playing dice with friends.

"There's always another Tour to win it back again", he is reputed to have said, although he never rode as well again. The one bet that he did win was that the army would forgive him for overstaying his leave.

He rode the Tour well again in 1906 but never to the level of the previous year, nevertheless winning stages and finishing third. He became a specialist in long-distance racing, in 1908 winning Bordeaux–Paris 26 minutes ahead of the next rider, Cyrille van Hauwaert. He twice came second in the race and once third. He came second in the 1906 Bol d'Or 24-hour race at the Vélodrome Buffalo in Paris. He rode a six-day event on the track, although he decided against specialising in what could have been a profitable career.

He stopped racing just before World War I and took over the family business.

Trousselier had an entertaining personality and a taste for practical jokes. He was known for training with friends and stopping with them at the most expensive restaurant they could find. Towards the end of the meal, they would start a mock argument in which their raised voices attracted the attention of the restaurateur. When he went to intervene, he was told the argument was over who among them was the best rider. The only way to settle it was a race and the restaurateur was invited to set a local landmark several kilometres distant to which the riders would race and then turn and race back to the restaurant. Whoever came in last would pay the bill.The restaurateur would then set his diners off on their race... only for them never to return.

== Career achievements ==
=== Major results ===
1905
Tour de France – 1st overall and 5 stage wins
Paris–Roubaix
Paris–Valenciennes
Brussels–Roubaix
1906 Tour de France
3rd overall and 4 stage wins
1907 Tour de France
2 stages (one tied with Emile Georget)
1908
Bordeaux–Paris
1909 Tour de France
1 stage win
1910 Tour de France
1 stage win

=== Grand Tour general classification results timeline ===
Grand Tour	1905	1906	1907	1908	1909	1910	1911	1912	1913	1914
Giro d'Italia	N/A	N/A	N/A	N/A	DNF-5	DNE	DNE	DNE	DNE	DNE
Tour de France	1	3	DNF-10	DNF-2	8	DNF-14	DNF-3	DNE	11	38
Vuelta a España	N/A	N/A	N/A	N/A	N/A	N/A	N/A	N/A	N/A	N/A

Legend
1	Winner
2–3	Top three-finish
4–10	Top ten-finish
11–	Other finish
DNE	Did not enter
DNF-x	Did not finish (retired on stage x)
DNS-x	Did not start (not started on stage x)
HD-x	Finished outside time limit (occurred on stage x)
DSQ	Disqualified
N/A	Race/classification not held
NR	Not ranked in this classification

== Death ==
He died on April 24, 1939, in Paris.
