= Georges Passerieu =

British-French cyclist

George Passerieu
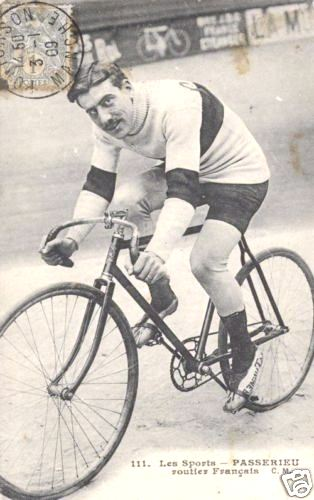

Personal information
- Full name: George Passerieu
- Nickname: l'Anglais du Paris (The Englishman from Paris)
- Born: 18 November 1885 London, United Kingdom
- Died: 5 May 1928 (aged 42) Épinay-sur-Orge, France

Cycling career
- Sport: Cycling
- Discipline: Road
- Role: Rider

Professional teams
- 1906–1908: Peugeot
- 1909: Griffon
- 1911: La Française
- 1913: Automoto
- 1914: Atala-Phebus-Dunlop

Major wins
- Paris–Tours; Paris–Roubaix; 7 stages Tour de France

George Leon Passerieu (London, 18 November 1885–Épinay-sur-Orge, 5 May 1928) was a British-born French professional road bicycle racer, who won seven stages in the Tour de France, and reached the podium twice. He also was the winner of Paris–Roubaix and Paris–Tours.

== Biography ==
According to the 1891 UK census (available on subscription) at , George Passerieu was born in Islington, London to French-born Auguste Passerieu and his wife Ellen (née Acraman) from the London district of Soho. Passerieu first rode the Tour in 1906, after he had just become a professional cyclist. He was strong in the mountains, finishing second to René Pottier in the third stage. Pottier was dominant in that Tour, but Passerieu was the best of the rest. Passerieu won the first stage, beating Pottier in Marseille after they had climbed the mountains together. Later he also won the twelfth stage, and finished second in the general classification.

In 1907, Passerieu was riding for the Peugeot team, which saw potential in Belgian cyclist Cyrille Van Hauwaert. Van Hauwaert refused requests from Peugeot to ride as helper for Passerieu, but instead signed for the La Française team. In the 1907 edition of Paris–Roubaix, Passerieu finished first, followed by Van Hauwaert.

Passerieu rode the 1908 Tour de France. He was the only cyclist to climb the Ballon d'Alsace and the Chartreuse without dismounting his bicycle.

Passerieu carried a British passport and raced on an NCU licence.

== Major results ==
1906
Tour de France:

Winner stages 6 and 12
2nd place overall classification

1907
Tour de France:

Winner stages 6 and 14

Paris–Roubaix
Paris–Tours
1908
Tour de France:

Winner stages 1, 5 and 13
3rd place overall classification

1909
Paris–Dijon
