= René Pottier =

French cyclist

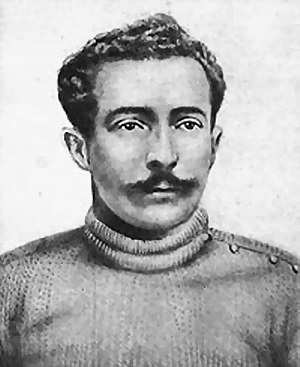

Personal information
- Full name: René Pottier
- Born: 5 June 1879 Moret-sur-Loing, France
- Died: 25 January 1907 (aged 27) Levallois-Perret, France

Cycling career
- Sport: Cycling
- Discipline: Road
- Role: Rider

Major wins
- Grand Tours Tour de France General classification (1906) Mountains classification (1905, 1906) 5 individual stages (1906) One-day races and Classics Paris–Caen (1903)

René Pottier (French pronunciation: [ʁəne pɔtje]; 5 June 1879 – 25 January 1907) was a French racing cyclist.

Pottier won the amateur category of the 1903 Bordeaux–Paris race before turning professional. He came second in Paris–Roubaix 1905 and Bordeaux–Paris 1905, then third in 1906's Paris–Roubaix, before winning the Tour de France in 1906.

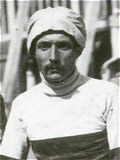
Rene Pottier

He was considered the finest climber of the Tour. In the 1905 race he was first up the Ballon d'Alsace but lost the lead to Hippolyte Aucouturier after nails punctured his final spare tyre. He finished the stage only when Aucouturier gave him one of his spare tyres. Injury due to a fall on the next stage to Grenoble caused him to abandon.

The following year he took five stage wins out of thirteen and overall victory with 31 points. Again he was first up the Ballon d'Alsace but this time he stayed ahead, finishing at Dijon 48 minutes before his nearest competitor. He also won in Grenoble by fifteen minutes and at Nice by 26 minutes. He completed the 4,546 km in 189 hours, 34 minutes at an average 23.98kmh.

In September 1906 he won the Bol d'Or 24-hour cycle race at the Vélodrome Buffalo in Paris with 925.290 km.

On 25 January 1907 he committed suicide by hanging himself on his bike hook after hearing his wife had found a lover while he was away at the Tour. A few weeks later, Henri Desgrange, patron of the Tour, erected a stele in his memory at the top of the Ballon d'Alsace, a summit in Vosges.

== 1906 Tour de France ==
In 1906, the Tour crossed the Col du Ballon d'Alsace for the second time and Pottier was again the first rider over the summit. He arrived at Saint-Maurice-sur-Moselle in a group of 19 riders: according to L'Auto: "At the foot of the climb, Pottier bolted, as if the bell had sounded the final lap of a track race. He hadn't reached the first hairpin before the group was torn apart." The other riders soon dropped away with only Augustin Ringeval able to briefly keep in contact with Pottier although even he was dropped well before the summit:

Pottier and Ringeval are alone now. A brief but terrifying duel breaks out, until, making a final demand from his boundless reserves, the leader pulls away into the teeth of the gradient. Ringeval loses ground, makes it up again with a magnificent effort, then drops back again, done for!

Pottier crossed the summit alone, over four minutes ahead of the next rider and maintained his lead into the stage finish at Dijon, going on to win the whole race in Paris three weeks later.

Those of us who witnessed his interminable, solitary, high-speed ride were left wondering whether it had not all been a dream, and asking ourselves what mysterious force it is that possesses the human organism and allows it to push back the boundaries of the possible.

Following his death, a monument to him was erected at the summit of the Col du Ballon d'Alsace.

== Tour de France results ==
- 1905 Tour de France: Abandoned after the 3rd stage
- 1906 Tour de France: Overall winner and winner of 5 stages

=== Grand Tour general classification results timeline ===
Grand Tour	1905	1906
Giro d'Italia	N/A	N/A
Tour de France	DNF-3	1
Vuelta a España	N/A	N/A

Legend
1	Winner
2–3	Top three-finish
4–10	Top ten-finish
11–	Other finish
DNE	Did not enter
DNF-x	Did not finish (retired on stage x)
DNS-x	Did not start (not started on stage x)
HD-x	Finished outside time limit (occurred on stage x)
DSQ	Disqualified
N/A	Race/classification not held
NR	Not ranked in this classification
