= Émile Georget =

French road racing cyclist

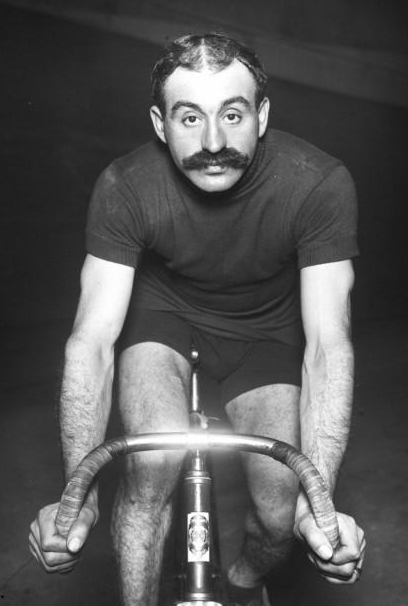

Personal information
- Full name: Émile Georget
- Born: 21 September 1881 Bossay-sur-Claise, France
- Died: 16 October 1960 (aged 79) Châtellerault, France

Cycling career
- Sport: Cycling
- Disciplines: Road and track
- Role: Rider

Professional teams
- 1910: Legnano
- 1911: La Francaise
- 1914: Peugeot-Wolber

Major wins
- French Champion (1910); Bordeaux–Paris (1910, 1912); Paris–Brest–Paris (1911); 3rd place overall Tour de France (1907 ,1911); 9 stages wins Tour de France

Émile Georget (21 September 1881 – 16 October 1960) was a French road racing cyclist. Born in Bossay-sur-Claise, he was the younger brother of cyclist Léon Georget. He died at Châtellerault.

== Career achievements ==
=== Tour de France ===
Georget started nine times in the Tour de France:

- 1905 : 4th place in the general classification.
- 1906 : 5th place in the general classification, winner of one stage.
- 1907 : 3rd place in the general classification, winner of six stages.
- 1908 : Withdrew in 2nd stage.
- 1910 : Withdrew in 12th stage, winner of one stage.
- 1911 : 3rd place in the general classification, winner of one stage.
- 1912 : Withdrew in 3rd stage.
- 1913 : Did not start in 4th stage.
- 1914 : 6th in the general classification.

=== Victories ===
Other than in the Tour de France, Georget won eight races:

- 1906 : 24 hours of Brussels: (with his brother Léon Georget)
- 1907 : Paris-Hesdin
- 1909 : Paris-La Flèche
- 1910 : French road champion
- 1910 : Bordeaux–Paris
- 1911 : Circuit de Touraine
- 1911 : Paris–Brest–Paris
- 1912 : Bordeaux–Paris

=== Other Results ===
- 2nd place in the 1909 Milan–San Remo race.
- 3rd place at Paris–Tours 1907, Bordeaux–Paris 1908 and Paris–Tours 1911.
- Winner of the Six-Days of Toulouse 1906 with his brother Léon.
