= List of Belgian cyclists who have led the Tour de France general classification =

In the Tour de France, one of the three Grand Tours of professional stage cycling, the yellow jersey is given to the leader of the general classification. The Tour de France is the most famous road cycling event in the world, and is held annually in the month of July. Although all riders compete together, the winners of the Tour are divided into classifications, each best known by the coloured jersey that is worn by the leader of it; the general classification (GC), represented by the maillot jaune (yellow jersey), is for the overall leader in terms of the lowest time. The other individual classifications in the Tour de France are the points classification, also known as the sprinters' classification (green jersey), the mountains classification (polka dot jersey), and the young rider classification (white jersey).

The first Tour de France was in 1903, but the yellow jersey was only introduced during the 1919 Tour de France, during which Firmin Lambot was the first Belgian cyclist ever to wear the yellow jersey.

== List ==
"Obtained" refers to the date and stage where the rider secured the lead of the general classification at the finish; the rider would first wear the yellow jersey in the stage after, where he would start the day as leader. "Relinquished" refers to the date and stage where the rider lost the lead, and therefore was not wearing the yellow jersey the following stage.

List of Belgian cyclists who wore the yellow jersey
Year	Name	Team	Obtained			Relinquished			Final GC	Notes
Year	Name	Team	Stage	Date	From	Stage	Date	To	Final GC	Notes
1919	Firmin Lambot		14, Metz — Dunkirk	July 25, 1919	Eugène Christophe (FRA)	winner			1st place, gold medalist(s)	
1920	Louis Mottiat		1, Paris — Le Havre	June 27, 1920	Opening stage	2, Le Havre — Cherbourg	June 29, 1920	Philippe Thys (BEL)	DNF	
1920	Philippe Thys		2, Le Havre — Cherbourg	June 29, 1920	Louis Mottiat (BEL)	winner			1st place, gold medalist(s)	
1921	Louis Mottiat		1, Paris — Le Havre	June 26, 1921	Opening stage	2, Le Havre — Cherbourg	June 28, 1921	Léon Scieur (BEL)	11th	
1921	Léon Scieur		2, Le Havre — Cherbourg	June 28, 1921	Louis Mottiat (BEL)	winner			1st place, gold medalist(s)	
1922	Hector Heusghem		12, Geneva — Strasbourg	July 17, 1922	Jean Alavoine (FRA)	13, Strasbourg — Metz	July 19, 1922	Firmin Lambot (BEL)	4th	
1922	Firmin Lambot		13, Strasbourg — Metz	July 19, 1922	Hector Heusghem (BEL)	winner			1st place, gold medalist(s)	
1925	Adelin Benoît	Thomann	3, Cherbourg — Brest	June 25, 1925	Ottavio Bottecchia (ITA)	7, Bordeaux — Bayonne	June 29, 1925	Ottavio Bottecchia (ITA)	12th	
1925	Adelin Benoît	Thomann	8, Bayonne — Luchon	July 1, 1925	Ottavio Bottecchia (ITA)	9, Luchon — Perpignan	July 3, 1925	Ottavio Bottecchia (ITA)	12th	
1926	Jules Buysse	Automoto–Hutchinson	1, Évian — Mülhausen	June 20, 1926	Opening stage	3, Metz — Dunkirk	June 24, 1926	Gustaaf Van Slembrouck (BEL)	9th	
1926	Gustaaf Van Slembrouck	J.B. Louvet-Wolber	3, Metz — Dunkirk	June 24, 1926	Jules Buysse (BEL)	10, Bayonne — Luchon	July 6, 1926	Lucien Buysse (BEL)	DNF	
1926	Lucien Buysse	Automoto–Hutchinson	10, Bayonne — Luchon	July 6, 1926	Gustaaf Van Slembrouck (BEL)	winner			1st place, gold medalist(s)	
1927	Hector Martin	J.B. Louvet	7, Brest — Vannes	June 25, 1927	Ferdinand Le Drogo (FRA)	11, Bayonne — Luchon	June 30, 1927	Nicolas Frantz (LUX)	9th	
1929	Aimé Dossche		1, Paris — Caen	June 30, 1929	Opening stage	4, Dinan — Brest	July 3, 1929	Maurice De Waele (BEL)	DNF	
1929	Maurice De Waele	Alcyon	4, Dinan — Brest	July 3, 1929	Aimé Dossche (BEL)	7, Les Sables-d'Olonne — Bordeaux	July 6, 1929	Nicolas Frantz (LUX); André Leducq (FRA); Victor Fontan (FRA) (Note: After the seventh stage, Frantz, Leducq and Fontan led the general classification with exactly the same time. There was no rule in this situation to determine who was the leader, so all three were considered leaders and were given yellow jerseys for the next stage.)	1st place, gold medalist(s)	
1929	Maurice De Waele	Alcyon	10, Luchon — Perpignan	July 11, 1929	Victor Fontan (FRA)	winner			1st place, gold medalist(s)	
1929	Gaston Rebry	Alcyon	8, Bordeaux — Bayonne	July 7, 1929	Nicolas Frantz (LUX); André Leducq (FRA); Victor Fontan (FRA)	9, Bayonne — Luchon	July 9, 1929	Victor Fontan (FRA)	10th	
1931	Alfred Haemerlinck	Belgium	1, Paris — Caen	June 30, 1931	Opening stage	2, Caen — Dinan	July 1, 1931	Max Bulla (AUT)	DNF	
1932	Jean Aerts	Belgium	1, Paris — Caen	July 6, 1932	Opening stage	2, Caen — Nantes	July 7, 1932	Kurt Stöpel (GER)	13th	
1933	Georges Lemaire	Belgium	9, Gap — Digne	July 6, 1933	Maurice Archambaud (FRA)	11, Nice — Cannes	July 9, 1933	Maurice Archambaud (FRA)	4th	
1935	Romain Maes	Belgium	1, Paris — Lille	July 4, 1935	Opening stage	winner			1st place, gold medalist(s)	
1936	Sylvère Maes	Belgium	8, Grenoble — Briançon	July 15, 1936	Maurice Archambaud (FRA)	winner			1st place, gold medalist(s)	
1937	Marcel Kint	Belgium	3, Charleville — Metz	July 2, 1937	Jean Majerus (LUX)	4, Metz — Belfort	July 3, 1937	Erich Bautz (GER)	DNF	
1937	Sylvère Maes	Belgium	9, Briançon — Digne	July 9, 1937	Maurice Archambaud (FRA)	17a, Bordeaux — Royan	July 9, 1937	Roger Lapébie (FRA)	DNF	
1938	Félicien Vervaecke	Belgium	8, Pau — Luchon	July 14, 1938	Jean Majerus (LUX)	14, Digne — Briançon	July 22, 1938	Gino Bartali (ITA)	2nd place, silver medalist(s)	
1939	Romain Maes	Belgium	2a, Caen — Vire	July 11, 1939	Amédée Fournier (FRA)	2b, Vire — Rennes	July 11, 1939	Jean Fontenay (FRA)	DNF	
1939	Sylvère Maes	Belgium	15, Digne — Briançon	July 26, 1939	René Vietto (FRA)	winner			1st place, gold medalist(s)	
1948	Jan Engels	Aiglons	2, Trouville — Dinard	July 1, 1948	Gino Bartali (ITA)	3, Dinard — Nantes	July 2, 1948	Louison Bobet (FRA)	22nd	
1948	Roger Lambrecht	Internationals	4, Nantes — La Rochelle	July 3, 1948	Louison Bobet (FRA)	6, Bordeaux — Biarritz	July 5, 1948	Louison Bobet (FRA)	7th	
1949	Roger Lambrecht	Belgium	2, Reims — Brussels	July 1, 1949	Marcel Dussault (FRA)	3, Brussels — Boulogne-sur-Mer	July 2, 1949	Norbert Callens (BEL)	11th	
1949	Norbert Callens	Belgium	3, Brussels — Boulogne-sur-Mer	July 2, 1949	Roger Lambrecht (BEL)	4, Boulogne-sur-Mer — Rouen	July 3, 1949	Jacques Marinelli (FRA)	DNF	
1952	Rik Van Steenbergen	Belgium	1, Brest — Rennes	June 25, 1952	Opening stage	3, Le Mans — Rouen	June 27, 1952	Nello Lauredi (FRA)	DNF	
1956	Gilbert Desmet	Belgium	3, Lille — Rouen	July 7, 1956	André Darrigade (FRA)	4b, Rouen — Caen	July 8, 1956	André Darrigade (FRA)	21st	
1956	Jan Adriaensens	Belgium	12, Pau — Luchon	July 17, 1956	André Darrigade (FRA)	15, Montpellier — Aix-en-Provence	July 20, 1956	Wout Wagtmans (NED)	3rd place, bronze medalist(s)	
1958	Jos Hoevenaers	Belgium	2, Ghent — Dunkirk	June 27, 1958	André Darrigade (FRA)	3, Dunkirk — Mers-les-Bains	June 28, 1958	Wim van Est (NED)	10th	
1959	Eddy Pauwels	Belgium	9, Bordeaux — Bayonne	July 3, 1959	Robert Cazala (FRA)	10, Bayonne — Bagnères-de-Bigorre	July 5, 1959	Michel Vermeulin (FRA)	11th	
1959	Eddy Pauwels	Belgium	16, Clermont-Ferrand — Saint-Étienne	July 11, 1959	Jos Hoevenaers (BEL)	17, Saint-Étienne — Grenoble	July 13, 1959	Federico Bahamontes (ESP)	11th	
1959	Jos Hoevenaers	Belgium	13, Albi — Aurillac	July 8, 1959	Michel Vermeulin (FRA)	16, Clermont-Ferrand — Saint-Étienne	July 11, 1959	Eddy Pauwels (BEL)	8th	
1960	Julien Schepens	Belgium	1a, Lille — Brussels	June 26, 1960	Opening stage	1b, Brussels — Brussels	June 26, 1960	Gastone Nencini (ITA)	DNF	
1960	Jan Adriaensens	Belgium	6, Saint-Malo — Lorient	July 1, 1960	Henry Anglade (FRA)	10, Mont-de-Marsan — Pau	July 5, 1960	Gastone Nencini (ITA)	3rd place, bronze medalist(s)	
1962	Willy Schroeders	Flandria–Faema–Clément	9, La Rochelle — Bordeaux	July 2, 1962	André Darrigade (FRA)	12, Pau — Saint-Gaudens	July 5, 1962	Tom Simpson (GBR)	DNF	
1962	Jef Planckaert	Flandria–Faema–Clément	13, Luchon — Superbagnères	July 6, 1962	Tom Simpson (GBR)	20, Bourgoin — Lyon	July 13, 1962	Jacques Anquetil (FRA)	2nd place, silver medalist(s)	
1963	Eddy Pauwels	Wiel's–Groene Leeuw	1, Paris — Épernay	June 23, 1963	Opening stage	3, Jambes — Roubaix	June 25, 1963	Seamus Elliott (IRL)	13th	
1963	Gilbert Desmet	Wiel's–Groene Leeuw	6b, Angers — Angers	June 28, 1963	Seamus Elliott (IRL)	16, Grenoble — Val-d'Isère	July 9, 1963	Federico Bahamontes (ESP)	5th	
1964	Edward Sels	Solo–Superia	1, Rennes — Lisieux	June 22, 1964	Opening stage	3a, Amiens — Forest	June 24, 1964	Bernard Van de Kerckhove (BEL)	33rd	
1964	Bernard Van de Kerckhove	Solo–Superia	3a, Amiens — Forest	June 24, 1964	Edward Sels (BEL)	5, Lunéville — Freiburg	June 26, 1964	Rudi Altig (GER)	57th	
1965	Rik Van Looy	Solo–Superia	1a, Cologne — Liège	June 22, 1965	Opening stage	2, Liège — Roubaix	June 23, 1965	Bernard Van de Kerckhove (BEL)	31st	
1965	Bernard Van de Kerckhove	Solo–Superia	2, Liège — Roubaix	June 23, 1965	Rik Van Looy (BEL)	3, Roubaix — Rouen	June 24, 1965	Felice Gimondi (ITA)	DNF	
1965	Bernard Van de Kerckhove	Solo–Superia	7, La Baule — La Rochelle	June 28, 1965	Felice Gimondi (ITA)	9, Dax — Bagnères-de-Bigorre	June 30, 1965	Felice Gimondi (ITA)	DNF	
1967	Willy Van Neste	Belgium	2, Saint-Malo — Caen	July 1, 1967	José María Errandonea (ESP)	3, Caen — Amiens	July 2, 1967	Giancarlo Polidori (ITA)	33rd	
1967	Jozef Spruyt	Belgium	4, Amiens — Roubaix	July 3, 1967	Giancarlo Polidori (ITA)	5a, Roubaix — Jambes	July 4, 1967	Roger Pingeon (FRA)	57th	
1968	Herman Van Springel	Belgium A	3a, Forest — Forest	June 30, 1968	Charly Grosskost (FRA)	4, Roubaix — Rouen	July 1, 1968	Jean-Pierre Genet (FRA)	2nd place, silver medalist(s)	
1968	Herman Van Springel	Belgium A	19, La Baule — La Rochelle	July 18, 1968	Gregorio San Miguel (ESP)	22b, Dax — Bagnères-de-Bigorre	July 21, 1968	Jan Janssen (NED)	2nd place, silver medalist(s)	
1968	Georges Vandenberghe	Belgium B	5a, Rouen — Bagnoles-de-l'Orne	July 2, 1968	Jean-Pierre Genet (FRA)	16, Albi — Aurillac	July 15, 1968	Rolf Wolfshohl (GER)	18th	
1969	Eddy Merckx	Faema	1b, Woluwe-Saint-Pierre — Woluwe-Saint-Pierre	June 29, 1969	Rudi Altig (GER)	2, Woluwe-Saint-Pierre — Maastricht	June 30, 1969	Julien Stevens (BEL)	1st place, gold medalist(s)	
1969	Eddy Merckx	Faema	6, Mulhouse — Ballon d'Alsace	July 4, 1969	Désiré Letort (FRA)	winner			1st place, gold medalist(s)	
1969	Julien Stevens	Faema	2, Woluwe-Saint-Pierre — Maastricht	June 30, 1969	Eddy Merckx (BEL)	5, Nancy — Mulhouse	July 3, 1969	Désiré Letort (FRA)	72nd	
1970	Eddy Merckx	Faemino–Faema	P, Limoges	June 27, 1970	Opening stage	2, La Rochelle — Angers	June 28, 1970	Italo Zilioli (ITA)	1st place, gold medalist(s)	
1970	Eddy Merckx	Faemino–Faema	6, Amiens — Valenciennes	July 2, 1970	Italo Zilioli (ITA)	winner			1st place, gold medalist(s)	
1971	Eddy Merckx	Molteni	P, Mulhouse	June 26, 1971	Opening stage	1b, Basel — Freiburg	June 27, 1971	Rini Wagtmans (NED)	1st place, gold medalist(s)	
1971	Eddy Merckx	Molteni	1c, Freiburg — Mulhouse	June 27, 1971	Rini Wagtmans (NED)	10, Saint-Étienne — Grenoble	July 7, 1971	Joop Zoetemelk (NED)	1st place, gold medalist(s)	
1971	Eddy Merckx	Molteni	14, Revel — Luchon	July 12, 1971	Luis Ocaña (ESP)	winner			1st place, gold medalist(s)	
1972	Eddy Merckx	Molteni	P, Angers	July 1, 1972	Opening stage	1, Angers — Saint-Brieuc	July 2, 1972	Cyrille Guimard (FRA)	1st place, gold medalist(s)	
1972	Eddy Merckx	Molteni	3b, Merlin-Plage — Merlin-Plage	July 4, 1972	Cyrille Guimard (FRA)	4, Merlin-Plage — Royan	July 5, 1972	Cyrille Guimard (FRA)	1st place, gold medalist(s)	
1972	Eddy Merckx	Molteni	8, Pau — Luchon	July 10, 1972	Cyrille Guimard (FRA)	winner			1st place, gold medalist(s)	
1973	Willy Teirlinck	Sonolor	1a, Scheveningen — Rotterdam	July 1, 1973	Joop Zoetemelk (NED)	1b, Rotterdam — Sint-Niklaas	July 1, 1973	Herman Van Springel (BEL)	60th	
1973	Herman Van Springel	Rokado–De Gribaldy	1b, Rotterdam — Sint-Niklaas	July 1, 1973	Willy Teirlinck (BEL)	3, Roubaix — Reims	July 3, 1973	José Catieau (FRA)	6th	
1974	Eddy Merckx	Molteni	P, Brest	June 27, 1974	Opening stage	1, Brest — Saint-Pol-de-Léon	June 28, 1974	Joseph Bruyère (BEL)	1st place, gold medalist(s)	
1974	Eddy Merckx	Molteni	4, Saint-Malo — Caen	July 1, 1974	Joseph Bruyère (BEL)	5, Caen — Dieppe	July 2, 1974	Gerben Karstens (NED)	1st place, gold medalist(s)	
1974	Eddy Merckx	Molteni	7, Mons — Châlons-sur-Marne	July 4, 1974	Gerben Karstens (NED)	winner			1st place, gold medalist(s)	
1974	Joseph Bruyère	Molteni	1, Brest — Saint-Pol-de-Léon	June 28, 1974	Eddy Merckx (BEL)	4, Saint-Malo — Caen	July 31, 1974	Eddy Merckx (BEL)	21st	
1974	Patrick Sercu	Brooklyn	6a, Dieppe — Harelbeke	July 3, 1974	Gerben Karstens (NED)	6b, Harelbeke — Harelbeke	July 3, 1974	Gerben Karstens (NED)	89th	
1975	Eddy Merckx	Molteni–RYC	6, Merlin-Plage — Merlin-Plage	July 2, 1975	Francesco Moser (ITA)	15, Nice — Pra-Loup	July 13, 1975	Bernard Thévenet (FRA)	2nd place, silver medalist(s)	
1976	Freddy Maertens	Flandria–Velda–West Vlaams Vleesbedrijf	P, Saint-Jean-de-Monts	June 24, 1976	Opening stage	9, Divonne-les-Bains — Alpe d'Huez	July 4, 1976	Lucien Van Impe (BEL)	8th	
1976	Lucien Van Impe	Gitane–Campagnolo	9, Divonne-les-Bains — Alpe d'Huez	July 4, 1976	Freddy Maertens (BEL)	12, Le Barcarès — Pyrénées 2000	July 8, 1976	Raymond Delisle (FRA)	1st place, gold medalist(s)	
1976	Lucien Van Impe	Gitane–Campagnolo	14, Saint-Gaudens — Saint-Lary-Soulan	July 10, 1976	Raymond Delisle (FRA)	winner			1st place, gold medalist(s)	
1978	Joseph Bruyère	C&A	8, Bordeaux — Biarritz	July 7, 1978	Gerrie Knetemann (NED)	16, Saint-Étienne — Alpe d'Huez	July 16, 1978	Joop Zoetemelk (NED)	4th	
1980	Rudy Pevenage	IJsboerke–Warncke Eis	3, Metz — Liège	June 29, 1980	Yvon Bertin (FRA)	11, Damazan — Laplume	July 8, 1980	Bernard Hinault (FRA)	42nd	
1982	Ludo Peeters	TI–Raleigh–Campagnolo	1, Basel — Möhlin	July 3, 1982	Bernard Hinault (FRA)	2, Basel — Nancy	July 4, 1982	Phil Anderson (AUS)	34th	
1983	Eric Vanderaerden	Jacky Aernoudt–Rossin–Campagnolo	P, Fontenay-sous-Bois	July 1, 1983	Opening stage	2, Soissons — Fontaine-au-Pire	July 3, 1983	Jean-Louis Gauthier (FRA)	DNF	
1984	Ludo Peeters	Kwantum–Decosol–Yoko	1, Bondy — Saint-Denis	June 30, 1984	Bernard Hinault (FRA)	2, Bobigny — Louvroil	July 1, 1984	Jacques Hanegraaf (NED)	57th	
1985	Eric Vanderaerden	Panasonic–Raleigh	1, Vannes — Lanester	June 29, 1985	Bernard Hinault (FRA)	4, Fougères — Pont-Audemer	July 2, 1985	Kim Andersen (DEN)	87th	
1993	Wilfried Nelissen	Novemail–Histor–Laser Computer	2, Les Sables-d'Olonne — Vannes	July 5, 1993	Miguel Induráin (ESP)	4, Dinard — Avranches	July 7, 1993	Mario Cipollini (ITA)	DNF	
1993	Wilfried Nelissen	Novemail–Histor–Laser Computer	5, Avranches — Évreux	July 8, 1993	Mario Cipollini (ITA)	6, Évreux — Amiens	July 9, 1993	Mario Cipollini (ITA)	DNF	
1993	Johan Museeuw	GB–MG Maglificio	7, Péronne — Châlons-sur-Marne	July 10, 1993	Mario Cipollini (ITA)	9, Lac de Madine — Lac de Madine	July 12, 1993	Miguel Induráin (ESP)	50th	
1994	Johan Museeuw	GB–MG Maglificio	3, Calais — Eurotunnel	July 5, 1994	Chris Boardman (GBR)	4, Dover — Brighton	July 6, 1994	Flavio Vanzella (ITA)	80th	
1994	Johan Museeuw	GB–MG Maglificio	7, Rennes — Futuroscope	July 9, 1994	Sean Yates (GBR)	9, Périgueux — Bergerac	July 11, 1994	Miguel Induráin (ESP)	80th	
1995	Johan Bruyneel	ONCE	7, Charleroi — Liège	July 8, 1995	Bjarne Riis (DEN)	8, Huy — Seraing	July 9, 1995	Miguel Induráin (ESP)	31st	
2001	Marc Wauters	Rabobank	2, Calais — Antwerp	July 9, 2001	Christophe Moreau (FRA)	3, Antwerp — Seraing	July 10, 2001	Stuart O'Grady (AUS)	DNF	
2006	Tom Boonen	Quick-Step–Innergetic	3, Esch-sur-Alzette — Valkenburg	July 4, 2006	Thor Hushovd (NOR)	7, Saint-Grégoire — Rennes	July 8, 2006	Serhiy Honchar (UKR)	DNF	
2011	Philippe Gilbert	Omega Pharma–Lotto	1, Passage du Gois — Mont des Alouettes	July 2, 2011	Opening stage	2, Les Essarts — Les Essarts	July 3, 2011	Thor Hushovd (NOR)	38th	
2013	Jan Bakelants	RadioShack–Leopard	2, Bastia — Ajaccio	June 30, 2013	Marcel Kittel (GER)	4, Nice — Nice	July 2, 2013	Simon Gerrans (AUS)	18th	
2016	Greg Van Avermaet	BMC Racing Team	5, Limoges — Le Lioran	July 6, 2016	Peter Sagan (SVK)	8, Pau — Luchon	July 9, 2016	Chris Froome (GBR)	44th	
2018	Greg Van Avermaet	BMC Racing Team	3, Cholet — Cholet	July 9, 2018	Peter Sagan (SVK)	11, Albertville — La Rosière	July 18, 2018	Geraint Thomas (GBR)	28th	
2022	Yves Lampaert	Quick-Step Alpha Vinyl Team	1, Copenhagen — Copenhagen	July 1, 2022	Opening stage	2, Roskilde — Nyborg	July 2, 2022	Wout van Aert (BEL)	119th	
2022	Wout van Aert	Team Jumbo–Visma	2, Roskilde — Nyborg	July 2, 2022	Yves Lampaert (BEL)	6, Binche — Longwy	July 7, 2022	Tadej Pogačar (SLO)	21st	
2025	Jasper Philipsen	Alpecin–Deceuninck	1, Lille — Lille	July 5, 2025	Opening stage	2, Lauwin-Planque — Boulogne-sur-Mer	July 6, 2025	Mathieu van der Poel (NED)	DNF	

== See also ==
- List of Australian cyclists who have led the Tour de France general classification
- List of British cyclists who have led the Tour de France general classification
- List of Dutch cyclists who have led the Tour de France general classification
- Yellow jersey statistics
