= 1996 UCI Road World Championships – Men's time trial =

Men's time trial
1996 UCI Road World Championships
- ITT rainbow jersey

Race details
- Dates: 10 October 1996
- Stages: 1
- Distance: 40.4 km (25.1 mi)
- Winning time: 48' 13"

Medalists
	Gold	Alex Zülle (SUI)
	Silver	Chris Boardman (GBR)
	Bronze	Tony Rominger (SUI)

The men's individual time trial (ITT) was held on 10 October 1996 in Lugano, Switzerland. The host nation claimed 2 medals as the reigning Vuelta a España champion, Alex Zülle took the rainbow jersey ahead of 1994 champion Chris Boardman and compatriot Tony Rominger.

== Final classification ==
Rank	Rider	Time
1st place, gold medalist(s)	Alex Zülle (SUI)	48' 13"
2nd place, silver medalist(s)	Chris Boardman (GBR)	+ 39"
3rd place, bronze medalist(s)	Tony Rominger (SUI)	+ 41"
4	Daniele Nardello (ITA)	+ 1' 01"
5	Andrea Peron (ITA)	+ 1' 34"
6	Uwe Peschel (GER)	+ 1' 36"
7	Juan Carlos Domínguez (ESP)	+ 1' 52"
8	Abraham Olano (ESP)	+ 1' 55"
9	Viatcheslav Ekimov (RUS)	+ 2' 22"
10	Neil Stephens (AUS)	+ 2' 34"
11	Michael Andersson (SWE)	+ 2' 34"
12	Michael Rich (GER)	+ 3' 34"
13	Tomasz Brożyna (POL)	+ 3' 36"
14	Michael Blaudzun (DEN)	+ 3' 43"
15	Christophe Moreau (FRA)	+ 3' 52"
16	Marc Streel (BEL)	+ 4' 04"
17	Christophe Bassons (FRA)	+ 4' 23"
18	Walter Bonca (SLO)	+ 4' 30"
19	Dariusz Baranowski (POL)	+ 4' 32"
20	Jan Karlsson (SWE)	+ 4' 35"
21	Erik Dekker (NED)	+ 4' 52"
22	Bert Roesems (BEL)	+ 5' 13"
23	Tyler Hamilton (USA)	+ 5' 16"
24	Chris Newton (GBR)	+ 5' 26"
25	František Trkal (CZE)	+ 5' 35"
26	Robert Pintarič (SLO)	+ 5' 44"
27	Eric Wohlberg (CAN)	+ 5' 44"
28	Andrey Mizurov (KAZ)	+ 6'
29	Ruslan Ivanov (MDA)	+ 6' 19"
30	Ján Valach (SVK)	+ 6' 41"
31	Alexei Sivakov (RUS)	+ 6' 49"
32	Emilio Carricondo (ARG)	+ 7' 41"
33	Miroslav Lipták (SVK)	+ 7' 43"
34	Luboš Lom (CZE)	+ 8' 29"
35	Ruben Antonio Pegorin (ARG)	+ 9' 32"
36	Mikoš Rnjaković (YUG)	+ 9' 38"
37	Kahka Okidadze (GEO)	+ 10' 27"
38	Besnik Musaji (ALB)	+ 10' 44"
39	Ardian Uka (ALB)	+ 13' 46"
40	Christian Kouyoumdjian (LIB)	+ 14' 30"
DNS	Joona Laukka (FIN)	
