= Lisa O'Keefe (sport administrator) =

British sportswoman and administrator

Lisa Margaret O'Keefe MBE, (born 1971), is a sport administrator and former international rugby player who played for Scotland and Richmond FC. She was an Executive Director at Sport England before taking on the role of Secretary General at IWG Women & Sport when the UK won the bid to host the organisation.

== Rugby career ==
She began her rugby career at Edinburgh Academical Football Club and went on to win her first International Cap against Wales (won 5-0) on the 18 December 1994, coming on as a substitute having played earlier in the day for Scotland A vs Wales A (won 5-0). She became the 34th woman to represent Scotland at rugby.

O'Keefe's playing career was put on hold in 1995 when she sustained two serious injuries. O'Keefe returned in 2001 as part of the Scotland team who beat Sweden before going on to be named in the Scotland Squad for the 2002 Rugby World Cup.

O'Keefe retired from Scotland following the 2006 Rugby World Cup and from Richmond Rugby Club following Richmonds victory in the 2006 English National Cup Final.

== Sport Administration Career ==
O'Keefe was Executive Director of Insight at Sport England, a role she held from 2013 to 2022. During that time, O'Keefe transformed the organisations approach to research and insight, and played an integral role in the development and delivery of Sport England's award-winning 'This Girl Can' campaign.

== Honours ==
O'Keefe was appointed Member of the Order of the British Empire (MBE) in the King's Birthday Honours List (2024) in recognition of her services to sport.
