= United Kingdom DodgeBall Association =

United Kingdom Dodgeball Association
- Sport: Dodge Ball
- Jurisdiction: United Kingdom
- Abbreviation: UKDBA
- Founded: 2005
- Headquarters: Stevenage, United Kingdom
- Closure date: 2018/2019

The United Kingdom DodgeBall Association (UKDBA) was a dodgeball association in the United Kingdom. Founded in 2005, the organisation was "de-recognised" by Sport England in 2018 and dissolved in 2019.

== History ==
The United Kingdom DodgeBall Association was founded in 2005 and based in Stevenage. Dodgeball was officially recognised as a sport in England in 2008.

In 2018, the UKDBA was "de-recognised" as the national governing body for dodgeball by Sport England and Sport Northern Ireland. According to Companies House, the UK Dodgeball Association Ltd was dissolved in 2019.

== League activity ==
=== Premier League ===
The Premier League was established in 2010. The six highest ranked teams in the UK competed over six weeks in the inaugural season. Jammy Dodgers claimed the 2010 title seeing off Warwick Warriors, Leicester City Ligers, Balls of Steel, Vipers and Derby Seahawks.

Season 2 saw the league expanded to eight teams and it was Bedford Bulls, one of the promoted sides, who won the 2011 title.

Derby Seahawks claimed the 2012/13 title.

The league expanded again for the 2013/14 season, increasing to 10 teams. The Meteors won the 2013/14 title.

=== National League ===
The National League was the second tier of UK dodgeball from which teams were promoted annually to the Premier League.

The first season, 2010/11, saw every team outside the Premier League divided into four regional conferences. Teams were ranked based on tournament performances throughout the season, with the top two teams from each conference qualifying for the play-offs. Bedford Bulls claimed promotion alongside play-off winners Meteors.

The 2011/12 season saw a change in format with the creation of an eight-team Division 1 in a traditional league setup. Division 2 was also set up in this season, running a similar setup to the National League in 2010/11 season, with four conferences divided between university and club teams and regional, North and South. Reepham Raiders claimed the Division 1 title and promotion alongside runners-up Imperial Wolverines. Division 2 play-offs were won by Bullet Dodgers beating fellow promoted side Winchester Bullets in the play-off final.

Fellows Appreciation Society claimed the Division 1 title in 2012/13 season, winning promotion alongside Bullet Dodgers. Balls of Steel reclaimed their Premier League place in a relegation/promotion play-off game against Leicester City Ligers. Fellows Appreciation Society allowed club mates Dirty Ducks to take their place in the Premier League. Division 2 Play-offs were won by Bedford Mighty Eagles, with all teams that made the play-offs getting promoted due to the league restructure.

In the 2013/14 season, the National League was restructured. Division 1 and 2 were split into three regional conferences of five teams, North, South West and South East. In Division 1, the top two from each conference win a place in the promotion play-off for the two Premier League places, the bottom two from each conferences enter the relegation play-offs with the bottom three being relegated into Division 2. In Division 2 the top two from each conference win a place in the promotion play-off for the three Division 1 places, the bottom two from each conferences enter the play-offs to avoid being relegated into non-league.

=== Women's Premier League ===
In 2013, the Women's Premier League was created. The six highest ranked teams in the UK competed over five weeks in the inaugural season. Bedford Mighty Eagles claimed the title with one week remaining, seeing off Leicester City Ligeresses, Southampton Dodgettes, Leeds Dodge Ladies, Derby Seahawks Women and Bedfordshire Bulls Women.

As of 2013, the UKDBA stated that there were 21 women's teams around the United Kingdom with "most of the teams" based in universities.
