= Lotus 108 =

Olympic individual pursuit bicycle

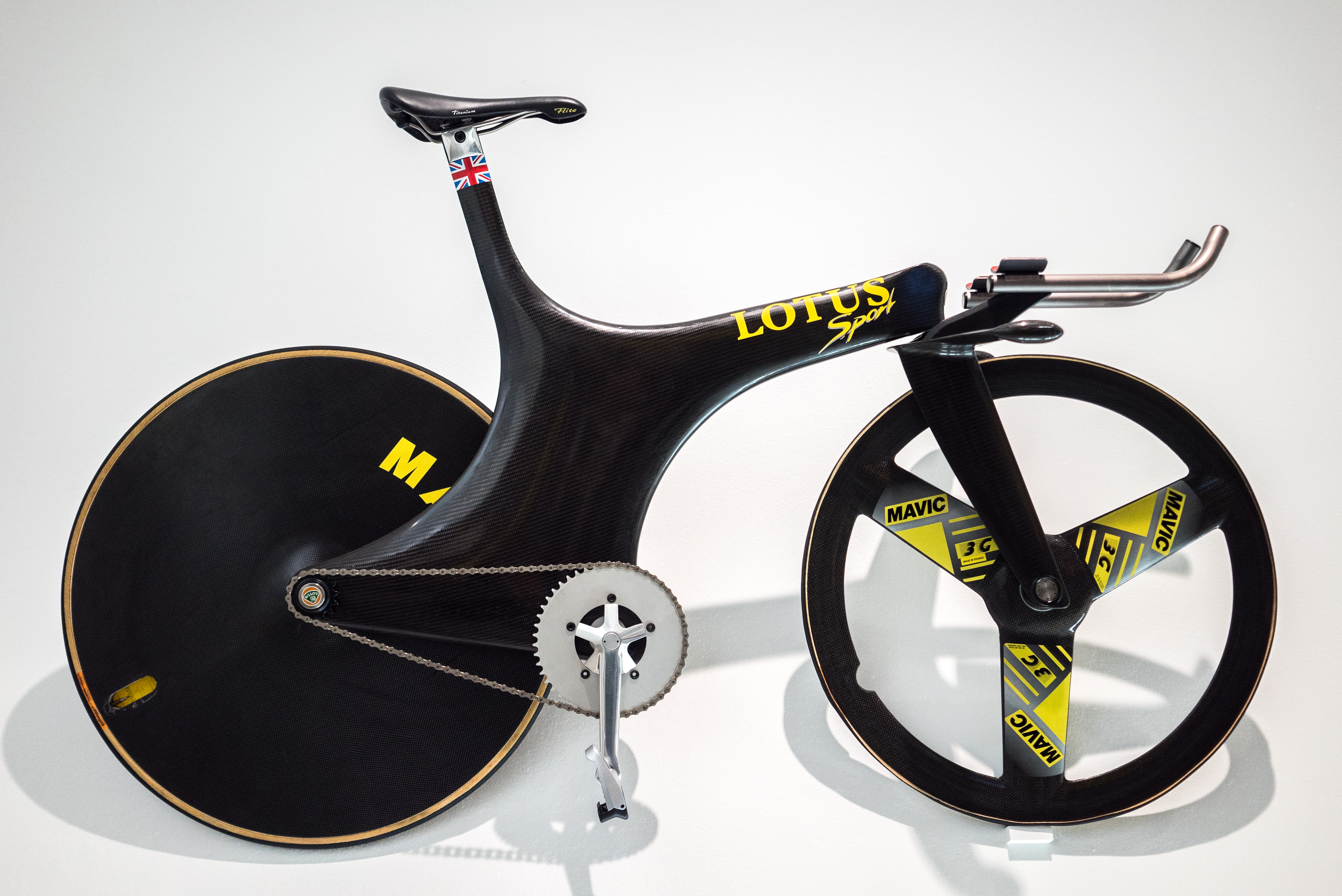
Lotus Type 108 bicycle

The Lotus Type 108 (originally known as LotusSport Pursuit Bicycle) is an Olympic individual pursuit bicycle. Its frame is an advanced aerofoil cross-section using a carbon composite monocoque.

== Development ==
The use of monocoque frames for bikes was not new, but their development was improved through the work of Norfolk-based designer Mike Burrows, who advanced both the design and build through utilising carbon fibre mouldings.

Burrows's design was initially rejected by British cycling manufacturers. However, it was to be received more enthusiastically by the British Cycling Federation. The design was considered illegal by the UCI. Therefore the project was prematurely shelved in 1987.

Three years later, in 1990, the Union Cycliste Internationale (UCI) revoked its previous ban on monocoques. By this time Burrows had lost enthusiasm for the concept and was focusing his attention on recumbent bicycles. However, his Mk2 Monocoque caught the attention of a keen local cyclist (and Lotus Engineering employee), Rudy Thomann. Aware of the revocation of the ban, Thomann took Burrows's design to Lotus Engineering. and presented it to his boss, Roger Becker. Roger could immediately see the potential of the design. Not only did it offer the opportunity for Lotus to utilize its expertise and diversify into a new market, but it also offered a morale lift to Lotus’s beleaguered workforce, which was suffering from the effects of the early 1990s recession.

With Roger Becker's enthusiasm and support on the Lotus board, Rudy headed a small team of specialists to explore the design further, harnessing Lotus’s knowledge of aerodynamics and carbon fibre. By February 1992, Lotus Engineering had acquired the rights and marketed the bike as the LotusSport Pursuit Bike. In addition, the design was modified and perfected through a series of wind tunnel tests conducted by the Lotus aerodynamics specialist Richard Hill.

UCI approved the bike for competition, and Bryan Steel rode it at an international race meeting in Leicester, shaving five seconds off his time in the two kilometre pursuit.

== Racing ==
The profile of Lotus and Burrows was raised at the 1992 Barcelona Olympics. Chris Boardman won the 4000m pursuit, catching World Champion Jens Lehmann in the final, and setting a new world record of 4 minutes 24.496 seconds in the quarter-finals. The publicity of this medal, the first British cycling gold medal at the Olympics in 72 years, confirmed to Lotus the potential of marketing a production version. This was to become the Lotus Type 110.

British professional cyclist Shaun Wallace raced a model 108 (proto 2B) at the 1992 professional world cycling championships, finishing second in the 5 km pursuit. His model 108 (proto 2B) as well as proto 2A were later offered for sale by Bonhams.

== Current locations ==
A total of sixteen type 108 were built. One prototype (1A) for windtunnel tests in 1991, as well as three frames with improved shape (proto 2A, 2B and 2C) of which two (proto 2A and 2C) had been actively used at the 1992 Olympic Games in Barcelona. After the Olympics, a further twelve factory replicas were offered for sale at £15,000 each. Of these twelve, one is on permanent display at the Lotus Factory at Hethel. Proto 2B is on display at the Barber Vintage Motorsports Museum, located in Birmingham, Alabama, US. Proto 2A is located in a private collection in Germany. ()

Chris Boardman’s Olympic gold medal winning bike (proto 2C) was on display at the Science Museum in South Kensington, London, in a temporary exhibition which ran from 16 March to 20 June 1993, entitled "SuperBike: An Exhibition on the Olympic Gold Medal Bicycle". The Science Museum keeps in its permanent collection one of the replicas made by Lotus Engineering. (Inventory Object Number 1993-76)

At auction, the four original models would fetch a selling price of approximately $200,000 plus premium. The 12 factory replicas are worth half that amount.
