= Mike Burrows (bicycle designer) =

British cycle designer (1943–2022)

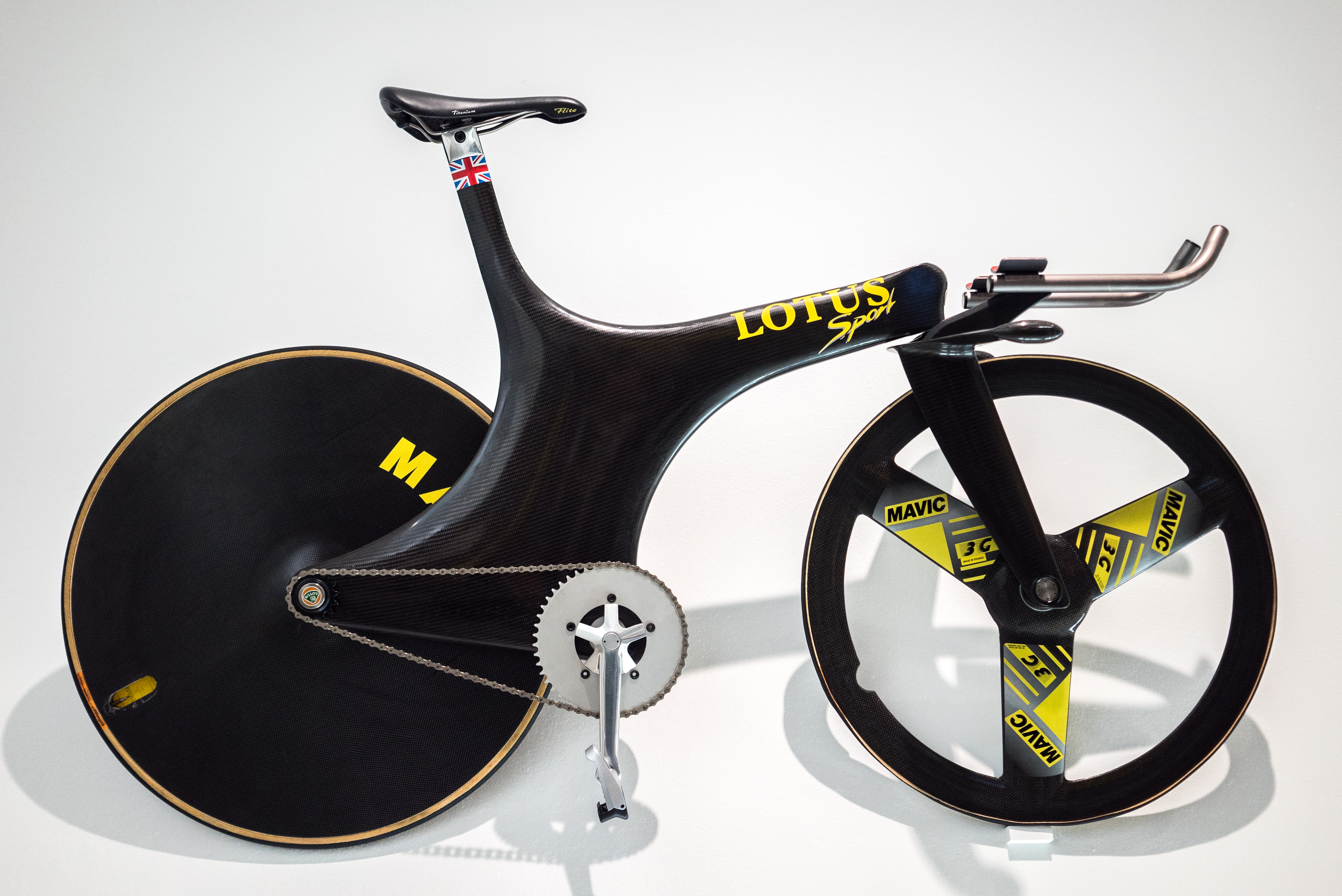
Lotus Type 108 bicycle

Michael Burrows (17 April 1943 – 15 August 2022) was an English bicycle designer from Norwich, England.

== Life and career ==
Michael Burrows was born in St Albans, Hertfordshire, England on 17 April 1943. He is best known for his collaborative work with the design of the track carbon-fibre Lotus 108 time trial bicycle manufactured by Lotus for Chris Boardman, when he won the 1992 Olympic 4000m pursuit in Barcelona. He also attempted to copy the famous "Old Faithful" bike used by Graeme Obree, to be used as a spare in an attempt on the world hour record. However Obree did not like the bike and did not use in any record attempt.

He had long been involved in the recumbent bicycle/tricycle world, having designed the Speedy or Windcheetah trike and more recently the Ratcatcher, Ratracer and Ratracer B. He has collaborated on projects with Richard Ballantine.

Burrows was also involved in utility cycling and designed a folding cycle (the Giant Halfway), an especially thin machine (the 2D) that takes up little space in a hallway, the 8-Freight cargo bike in use with cycle courier companies such as Outspoken Delivery, and makes customised screen and PA carrying freight bikes with extendable "batwings" for AV2 Hire.

In the 1990s, Burrows worked for Giant Bicycles and designed the compact frame TCR road bike among others, the bike design was truly revolutionary, to minimise bike manufacturing cost.

Burrows' designs often feature cantilever suspended wheels. He supplied a bike fitted with a front monoblade to television science presenter Adam Hart-Davis, which featured in some of Hart-Davis' programmes. Hart-Davis also owned a Speedy, finished in pink and yellow.

Burrows was involved with the design of a recumbent that could break the speed record for a human-powered vehicle (HPV). The design Aim 93 attempted to break the record at the International HPV Association's world championships at Battle Mountain.

Burrows died from lung cancer in Norwich, on 15 August 2022, at the age of 79.

== Bibliography ==
- Bicycle Design: Towards the Perfect Machine (ISBN 1-898457-07-7).
- From Bicycle to Superbike (ISBN 0953617459).
