= Sport England =

Non-departmental public body

- Founded: 1996; 30 years ago
- Founder: Department for Culture, Media and Sport
- Type: Non-departmental public body
- Headquarters: Loughborough, United Kingdom
- Region served: England
- Product: Funding
- Key people: Tim Hollingsworth, chief executive
- Website: www.sportengland.org

Sport England is a non-departmental public body under the Department for Culture, Media and Sport.

Its role is to build the foundations of a community sport system by working with national governing bodies of sport, and other funded partners, to grow the number of people taking part in sport and physical activity; remove the barriers that make it harder for some people to be active; sustain participation levels; and help more talented people from all diverse backgrounds excel by identifying them early, nurturing them, and helping them move up to the elite level.

As of 2025, Chris Boardman was the chairperson of Sport England.

== Overview ==
Sport England was established by royal charter in 1972 as The Sports Council, an independent body under the Department of National Heritage. It became The English Sports Council under an amended royal charter in 1997, when The Sports Council was reorganised into UK Sport and the home nations sports councils, before being rebranded as Sport England in 1999.

It has responsibility for investing in, promoting and increasing participation in sport and physical activity among the public. It has a statutory function to protect playing fields, through its role as a statutory consultee on planning applications that affect playing fields, under SI2015/595.

The funding it distributes comes from both HM Treasury and the National Lottery. Annually it invests up to £300 million of lottery and government money in projects and programmes that help people get active and play sport.

Sport England’s strategic vision and mission statement are set out in its ten-year strategy, Uniting the Movement, published in January 2021. One of its main goals is to tackle inequalities in sport and physical activity by investing in the people and communities who need it most, and helping to remove the barriers to being active.

It has sought to do this through its network of active partnerships across England and by partnering with places where inactivity levels are highest, fostering relationships with local organisations and leaders to help create the conditions for change. It also invests in more than 130 'system partners', which include several national governing bodies of sport, as well as active partnerships.

In April 2024, the public body simplified its funding application process with the launch of the Movement Fund, a single access point for sport and physical activity organisations of all sizes to apply for grants or crowdfunding pledges.

In May 2024, it launched its first-ever environmental sustainability strategy, Every Move. This included £45 million of new National Lottery funding to help the sport and physical activity sector respond to climate change.

With lottery funding, Sport England manages the award-winning This Girl Can campaign, launched in 2015. It's also a partner in the child-first coaching movement Play Their Way and the campaign to support people with long-term health conditions to be active, We Are Undefeatable.

In December 2023, it launched Buddle, a hub of guidance, resources and tools to help community sport and physical activity clubs, groups and organisations to thrive. This replaced Sport England's previous Club Matters offer.

The body encourages sports venues to enhance their development potential by registering under its SASP (significant areas for sport) programme as either a national or regional centre for their particular sport. It is responsible for the three national sports centres: Bisham Abbey, Lilleshall and Plas y Brenin.

Its Active Places website is designed to help the public find sports facilities anywhere in England. Searching can be through an interactive map, within a given locality or to discover more information about a known facility location.

Sport England's Active Design guidance, first published in 2007, provides a set of design guidelines to help promote opportunities for sport and physical activity in the design and layout of new development. It promotes 10 principles of Active Design, with a foundational principle of 'activity for all'. The latest iteration was published in 2023 with support from Active Travel England and the Office for Health Improvement and Disparities.

== Leadership ==
Derek Mapp resigned as chair of Sport England on 29 November 2007 after 13 months in the post, claiming he had been forced to leave his position by James Purnell, the Secretary of State for Culture, Media and Sport, in a dispute over funding. Mapp was succeeded by Michael Farrar as interim chair from December 2007 to March 2009. Purnell appointed Richard Lewis (former chief executive of the Rugby Football League) to review Sport England's funding priorities, and he was appointed chair on 1 April 2009.

On 22 April 2013, Nick Bitel was appointed as new chairman, succeeding Lewis. Bitel was succeeded by Chris Boardman, who began a four-year term on 22 July 2021. Boardman was reappointed in 2025.

== Logo and branding ==
The Sport England logo is based on the 'sport for all' logo which was used from the 1970s onwards.

== See also ==
- Sport in England
