= Yellow jersey statistics =

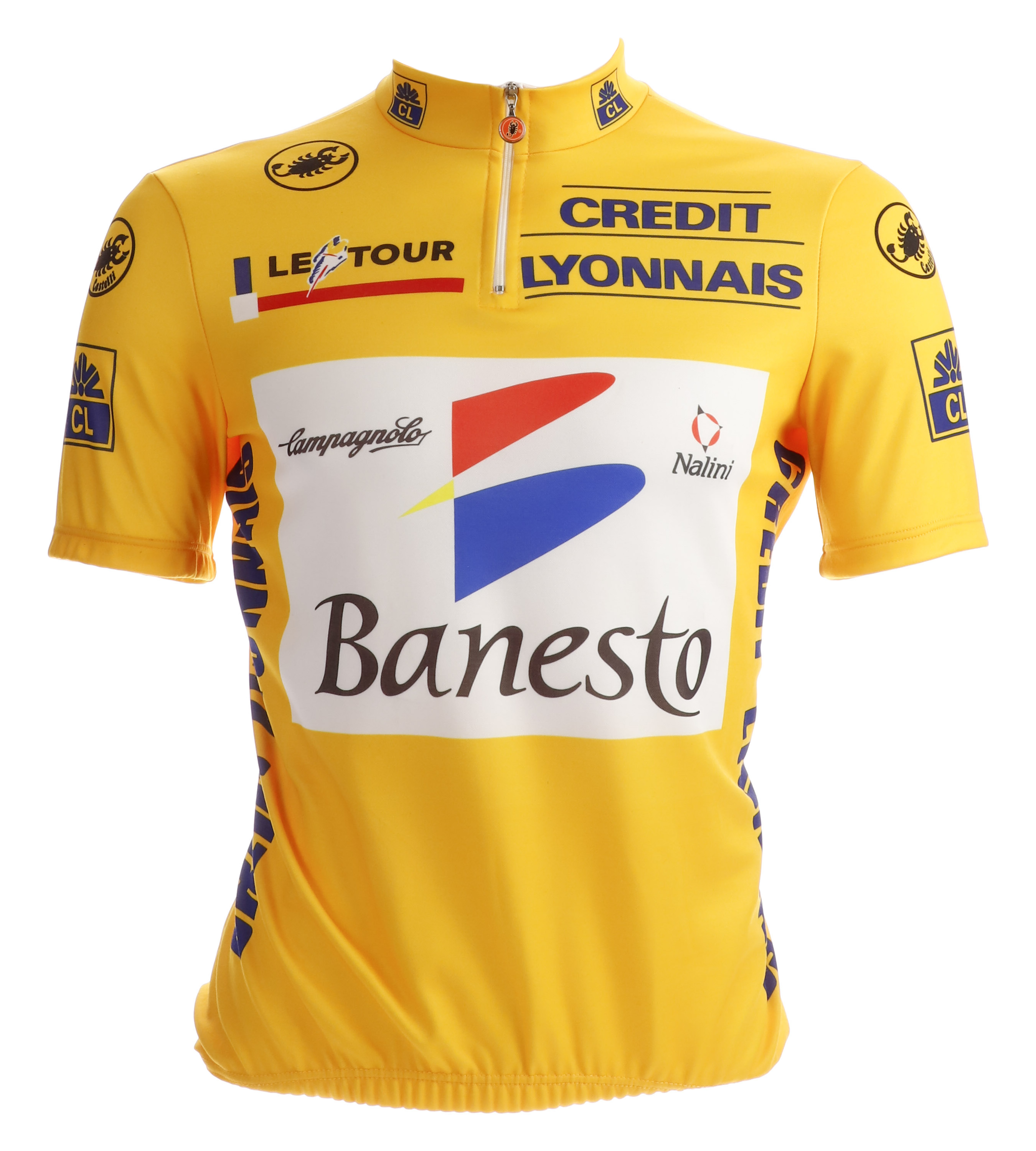
Yellow Jersey won by Miguel Induráin, collection KOERS. Museum of Cycle Racing.

Since the first Tour de France in 1903, there have been 2,310 stages, up to and including the final stage of the 2026 Tour de France. Since 1919, the race leader following each stage has been awarded the yellow jersey (French: Maillot jaune).

Although the leader of the classification after a stage gets a yellow jersey, he is not considered the winner of the yellow jersey, only the wearer. Only after the final stage, the wearer of the yellow jersey is considered the winner of the yellow jersey, and thereby the winner of the Tour de France.

In this article first-place-classifications before 1919 are also counted as if a yellow jersey was awarded. There have been more yellow jerseys given than there were stages: In 1914, 1929, and 1931, there were multiple cyclists with the same leading time, and the 1988 Tour de France had a "prelude", an extra stage for a select group of cyclists. As of 2021 a total of 2,208 yellow jerseys have been awarded in the Tour de France to 295 riders.

== Individual records ==
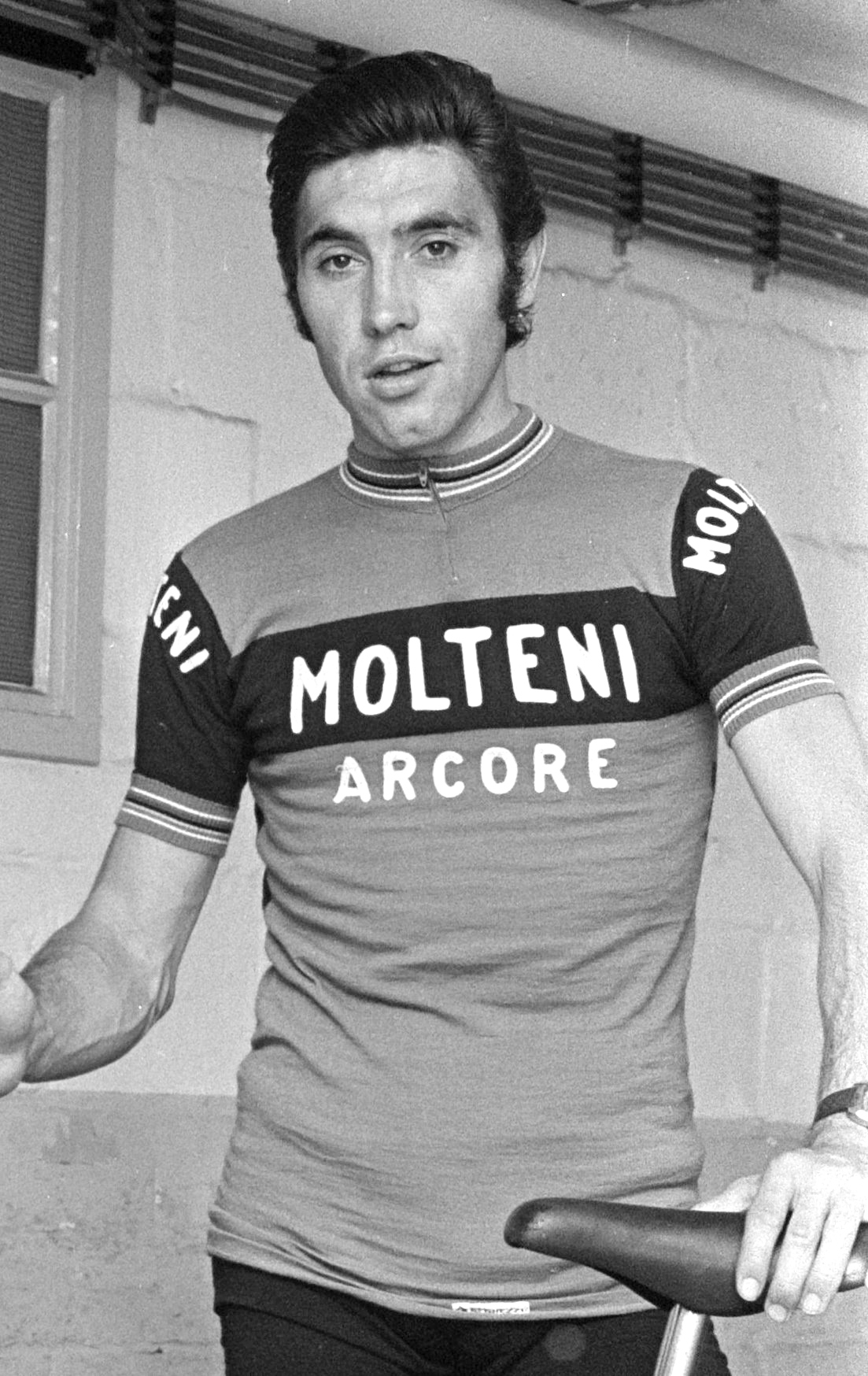
In addition to winning the general classification five times, Eddy Merckx has ridden the most days wearing the yellow jersey

In previous tours, sometimes a stage was broken in two (or three). On such occasions, only the cyclist leading at the end of the day is counted. The "Jerseys" column lists the number of days that the cyclist wore the yellow jersey; the "Tour wins" column gives the number of times the cyclist won the general classification. The next four columns indicate the number of times the rider won the points classification, the King of the Mountains classification, and the young rider competition, and the years in which the yellow jersey was worn, with bold years indicating an overall Tour win. For example: Eddy Merckx has spent 96 days in the yellow jersey, won the general classification five times, won the points classification three times, and won the mountains classification twice, but never won the young rider classification. He wore the yellow jersey in the Tours of 1969, 1970, 1971, 1972, 1974 (which he all won) and 1975 (which he did not win). Three cyclists (Jean Robic in 1947, Charly Gaul in 1958 and Jan Janssen in 1968) have won the Tour de France with only two yellow jerseys in their career.

Until the results of Lance Armstrong were annulled for cheating in 2012, he was ranked second in this list, leading the Tour for 83 stages from 1999 to 2005. Alberto Contador was stripped of the yellow jersey and 6 days of wearing it in 2010 Tour de France because he tested positive for doping.

Fabian Cancellara is, as of 2024, the rider with the most yellow jerseys for someone who has not won the Tour with twenty-nine days in yellow.

This table is updated through the final stage of the 2026 Tour de France (i.e. the stage is included).

Key
Cyclists who are still active
Cyclists who won the Tour de France

Rank	Name	Country	Yellow jerseys	Tour wins	Points	Mountains	Young rider	Years
1	Eddy Merckx	Belgium	96 (Note: In addition with all half (divided) stages in the past, Eddy Merckx worn 111 yellow jerseys in total.) (Note: Merckx may have worn it 97 times, but out of respect for Luis Ocaña, who - then the race leader - crashed on 14th stage of the 1971 Tour and was forced to leave the race due to injury, refused to accept the yellow jersey during closing ceremony of this stage. His request not to wear it in the next stage was granted.)	5	3	2	0	1969, 1970, 1971, 1972, 1974, 1975
2	Bernard Hinault	France	75 (Note: In addition with all half (divided) stages in the past, Bernard Hinault worn 79 yellow jerseys in total.)	5	1	1	0	1978, 1979, 1980, 1981, 1982, 1984, 1985, 1986
3	Tadej Pogačar	Slovenia	71	5	0	3	4	2020, 2021, 2022, 2024, 2025, 2026
4	Miguel Induráin	Spain	60	5	0	0	0	1991, 1992, 1993, 1994, 1995
5	Chris Froome	United Kingdom	59	4	0	1	0	2013, 2015, 2016, 2017
6	Jacques Anquetil	France	50	5	0	0	0	1957, 1961, 1962, 1963, 1964
7	Antonin Magne	France	38	2	0	0	0	1931, 1934
= 8	Nicolas Frantz (Note: In 1929, Nicolas Frantz (LUX), André Leducq (FRA) and Victor Fontan (FRA) were all three declared leader after the 7th stage.)	Luxembourg	37	2	0	0	0	1927, 1928, 1929
= 8	Philippe Thys (Note: In 1914, Philippe Thys and Jean Rossius were both declared leader for 4 days.)	Belgium	37	3	0	0	0	1913, 1914, 1920
10	André Leducq	France	35	2	0	0	0	1929, 1930, 1932, 1938
= 11	Louison Bobet	France	34	3	0	1	0	1948, 1953, 1954, 1955
= 11	Ottavio Bottecchia	Italy	34	2	0	0	0	1923, 1924, 1925
= 13	Fabian Cancellara	Switzerland	29	0	0	0	0	2004, 2007, 2009, 2010, 2012, 2015
= 13	Jonas Vingegaard	Denmark	29	2	0	1	0	2022, 2023, 2026
= 15	Sylvère Maes	Belgium	26	2	0	1	0	1936, 1937, 1939
= 15	René Vietto	France	26	0	0	1	0	1939, 1947
17	François Faber	Luxembourg	25	1	0	0	0	1909, 1910, 1911
= 18	Laurent Fignon	France	22	2	0	0	1	1983, 1984, 1989
= 18	Greg LeMond	United States	22	3	0	0	1	1986, 1989, 1990, 1991
= 18	Joop Zoetemelk	Netherlands	22	1	0	0	0	1971, 1973, 1978, 1979, 1980
21	Romain Maes	Belgium	21	1	0	0	0	1935
= 22	Gino Bartali	Italy	20	2	0	2	0	1937, 1938, 1948, 1949
= 22	Thomas Voeckler	France	20	0	0	1	0	2004, 2011
= 24	Fausto Coppi	Italy	19	2	0	2	0	1949, 1952
= 24	André Darrigade	France	19	0	2	0	0	1956, 1957, 1958, 1959, 1961, 1962
= 24	Vincenzo Nibali	Italy	19	1	0	0	0	2014
= 27	Julian Alaphilippe	France	18	0	0	1	0	2019, 2020, 2021
= 27	Felice Gimondi	Italy	18	1	0	0	0	1965
= 27	Jan Ullrich	Germany	18	1	0	0	3	1997, 1998
= 30	Rudi Altig	Germany	17	0	1	0	0	1962, 1964, 1966, 1969
= 30	Luis Ocaña	Spain	17	1	0	0	0	1971, 1973
= 30	Lucien Petit-Breton	France	17	2	0	0	0	1907, 1908
= 30	Roger Pingeon	France	17	1	0	0	0	1967
= 34	Odile Defraye	Belgium	16	1	0	0	0	1912, 1913
= 34	Maurice De Waele	Belgium	16	1	0	0	0	1929
= 34	Bernard Thévenet	France	16	2	0	0	0	1975, 1977
= 37	Pedro Delgado (Note: In 1988, on 19 July, there were two stages. Other than the split stages that the Tour de France saw earlier, these two stages were counted as individual stages, so Pedro Delgado received two yellow jerseys on that day.)	Spain	15	1	0	0	0	1987, 1988
= 37	Geraint Thomas	United Kingdom	15	1	0	0	0	2017, 2018
= 37	Dietrich Thurau	Germany	15	0	0	0	1	1977
= 40	Maurice Archambaud	France	14	0	0	0	0	1933, 1936
= 40	Steve Bauer	Canada	14	0	0	0	0	1988, 1990
= 40	Gastone Nencini	Italy	14	1	0	1	0	1960
= 40	Bjarne Riis	Denmark	14	1	0	0	0	1995, 1996
= 40	Léon Scieur	Belgium	14	1	0	0	0	1921
= 40	Bradley Wiggins	United Kingdom	14	1	0	0	0	2012
= 46	Eugène Christophe	France	13	0	0	0	0	1919, 1922
= 46	Gustave Garrigou	France	13	1	0	0	0	1911
= 46	René Pottier	France	13	1	0	0	0	1905, 1906
= 46	Andy Schleck (Note: Before Alberto Contador's 2010 Tour de France victory and days in yellow were officially removed, he wore the yellow jersey for 6 days. After his disqualification, Andy Schleck's total increased with 6 extra days.)	Luxembourg	13	1	0	0	3	2010, 2011
= 46	Georges Speicher	France	13	1	0	0	0	1933, 1934
= 51	Vincent Barteau	France	12	0	0	0	0	1984
= 51	Joseph Bruyère	Belgium	12	0	0	0	0	1974, 1978
= 51	Ferdinand Kübler	Switzerland	12	1	1	0	0	1947, 1950
= 51	Antonin Rolland	France	12	0	0	0	0	1955
= 51	Louis Trousselier	France	12	1	0	0	0	1905, 1907
= 51	Lucien Van Impe	Belgium	12	1	0	6	0	1976
= 51	Wout Wagtmans	Netherlands	12	0	0	0	0	1954, 1955, 1956
= 58	Alberto Contador	Spain	11	2	0	0	1	2007, 2009
= 58	Gilbert Desmet	Belgium	11	0	0	0	0	1956, 1963
= 58	Hugo Koblet	Switzerland	11	1	0	0	0	1951
= 58	Primož Roglič	Slovenia	11	0	0	0	0	2020
= 58	Greg Van Avermaet	Belgium	11	0	0	0	0	2016, 2018
= 58	Georges Vandenberghe	Belgium	11	0	0	0	0	1968
= 64	Kim Andersen	Denmark	10	0	0	0	0	1983, 1985
= 64	Thor Hushovd	Norway	10	0	2	0	0	2004, 2006, 2011
= 64	Pascal Lino	France	10	0	0	0	0	1992
= 64	Mathieu van der Poel	Netherlands	10	0	0	0	0	2021, 2025
= 68	Phil Anderson	Australia	9	0	0	0	1	1981, 1982
= 68	Georges Groussard	France	9	0	0	0	0	1964
= 68	Freddy Maertens	Belgium	9	0	2	0	0	1976
= 68	Fiorenzo Magni	Italy	9	0	0	0	0	1949, 1950, 1952
= 68	Stuart O'Grady	Australia	9	0	0	0	0	1998, 2001
= 68	Henri Pélissier	France	9	1	0	0	0	1919, 1923
= 68	Michael Rasmussen	Denmark	9	0	0	2	0	2007
= 75	Lucien Buysse	Belgium	8	1	0	0	0	1926
= 75	Claudio Chiappucci	Italy	8	0	0	2	0	1990
= 75	Cadel Evans	Australia	8	1	0	0	0	2008, 2010, 2011
= 75	Emile Georget	France	8	0	0	0	0	1906, 1907
= 75	Gerrie Knetemann	Netherlands	8	0	0	0	0	1978, 1979, 1980, 1981
= 75	Rinaldo Nocentini	Italy	8	0	0	0	0	2009
= 75	Óscar Pereiro (Note: Before Floyd Landis' 2006 Tour de France victory and days in yellow were officially removed, he wore the yellow jersey for 5 days. After his disqualification, Óscar Pereiro's total increased with 3 extra days.)	Spain	8	1	0	0	0	2006
= 75	Rudy Pevenage	Belgium	8	0	1	0	0	1980
= 75	Roger Walkowiak	France	8	1	0	0	0	1956
= 75	Adam Yates	United Kingdom	8	0	0	0	0	2020, 2023
= 85	Jan Adriaensens	Belgium	7	0	0	0	0	1956, 1960
= 85	Federico Bahamontes	Spain	7	1	0	6	0	1959, 1963
= 85	Bernard Gauthier	France	7	0	0	0	0	1950
= 85	Igor González de Galdeano	Spain	7	0	0	0	0	2002
= 85	Learco Guerra	Italy	7	0	0	0	0	1930
= 85	Erich Maechler	Switzerland	7	0	0	0	0	1987
= 85	Thierry Marie	France	7	0	0	0	0	1986, 1990, 1991
= 85	Charly Mottet	France	7	0	0	0	0	1987
= 85	Marco Pantani	Italy	7	1	0	0	2	1998
= 85	Jef Planckaert	Belgium	7	0	0	0	0	1962
= 85	Pascal Simon	France	7	0	0	0	0	1983
= 85	Gustaaf van Slembrouck	Belgium	7	0	0	0	0	1926
= 97	Lucien Aimar	France	6	1	0	0	0	1966
= 97	Chris Boardman	United Kingdom	6	0	0	0	0	1994, 1997, 1998
= 97	Robert Cazala	France	6	0	0	0	0	1959
= 97	Mario Cipollini	Italy	6	0	0	0	0	1993, 1997
= 97	Vito Favero	Italy	6	0	0	0	0	1958
= 97	Maurice Garin	France	6	1	0	0	0	1903
= 97	Cyrille Guimard	France	6	0	0	0	0	1972
= 97	Kim Kirchen	Luxembourg	6	0	0	0	0	2008
= 97	Jaan Kirsipuu	Estonia	6	0	0	0	0	1999
= 97	Roger Lévêque	France	6	0	0	0	0	1951
= 97	Jean Majerus	Luxembourg	6	0	0	0	0	1937, 1938
= 97	Jacques Marinelli	France	6	0	0	0	0	1949
= 97	Francesco Moser	Italy	6	0	0	0	1	1975
= 97	Fritz Schär	Switzerland	6	0	1	0	0	1953
= 97	Herman Van Springel	Belgium	6	0	1	0	0	1968, 1973
= 97	Félicien Vervaecke	Belgium	6	0	0	2	0	1938
= 113	Jean Alavoine	France	5	0	0	0	0	1922
= 113	Adelin Benoit	Belgium	5	0	0	0	0	1925
= 113	Firmin Lambot	Belgium	5	2	0	0	0	1919, 1922
= 113	Jean Malléjac	France	5	0	0	0	0	1953
= 113	Johan Museeuw	Belgium	5	0	0	0	0	1993, 1994
= 113	Jørgen V. Pedersen	Denmark	5	0	0	0	0	1986
= 113	Francis Pélissier	France	5	0	0	0	0	1927
= 113	Carlos Sastre	Spain	5	1	0	1	0	2008
= 113	Bernard Van de Kerkhove	Belgium	5	0	0	0	0	1964, 1965
= 113	Eric Vanderaerden	Belgium	5	0	1	0	0	1983, 1985
= 113	Cédric Vasseur	France	5	0	0	0	0	1997
= 124	Gilbert Bauvin	France	4	0	0	0	0	1951, 1954, 1958
= 124	Tom Boonen	Belgium	4	0	1	0	0	2006
= 124	José Catieau	France	4	0	0	0	0	1973
= 124	Alberto Elli	Italy	4	0	0	0	0	2000
= 124	Raphaël Géminiani	France	4	0	0	1	0	1958
= 124	Roger Hassenforder	France	4	0	0	0	0	1953
= 124	Jos Hoevenaers	Belgium	4	0	0	0	0	1958, 1959
= 124	Robert Jacquinot	France	4	0	0	0	0	1922, 1923
= 124	Laurent Jalabert	France	4	0	2	2	0	1995, 2000
= 124	Karl-Heinz Kunde	Germany	4	0	0	0	0	1966
= 124	Roger Lapébie	France	4	1	0	0	0	1937
= 124	Nello Lauredi	France	4	0	0	0	0	1952
= 124	Hector Martin	Belgium	4	0	0	0	0	1927
= 124	Raffaele di Paco (Note: In 1931, Charles Pélissier (FRA) and Raffaele Di Paco (ITA) were both declared leader after the 5th stage.)	Italy	4	0	0	0	0	1931
= 124	Eddy Pauwels	Belgium	4	0	0	0	0	1959, 1963
= 124	Jean Rossius	Belgium	4	0	0	0	0	1914
= 124	Peter Sagan	Slovakia	4	0	7	0	0	2016, 2018
= 124	Acácio da Silva	Portugal	4	0	0	0	0	1989
= 124	Rolf Sørensen	Denmark	4	0	0	0	0	1991
= 124	Wout van Aert	Belgium	4	0	1	0	0	2022
= 124	Wim van Est	Netherlands	4	0	0	0	0	1951, 1955, 1958
= 124	Gerrit Voorting	Netherlands	4	0	0	0	0	1956, 1958
= 124	Italo Zilioli	Italy	4	0	0	0	0	1970
= 124	Alex Zülle	Switzerland	4	0	0	0	0	1992, 1996
= 148	Erich Bautz	Germany	3	0	0	0	0	1937
= 148	Egan Bernal	Colombia	3	1	0	0	1	2019
= 148	Henri Cornet	France	3	1	0	0	0	1904
= 148	Bim Diederich	Luxembourg	3	0	0	0	0	1951
= 148	Aimé Dossche	Belgium	3	0	0	0	0	1929
= 148	Seamus Elliott	Ireland	3	0	0	0	0	1963
= 148	Jean Goldschmit	Luxembourg	3	0	0	0	0	1950
= 148	Stéphane Heulot	France	3	0	0	0	0	1996
= 148	Serhiy Honchar	Ukraine	3	0	0	0	0	2006
= 148	Roger Lambrecht	Belgium	3	0	0	0	0	1948, 1949
= 148	Floyd Landis	United States	3	0	0	0	0	2006
= 148	Octave Lapize	France	3	1	0	0	0	1910
= 148	Bradley McGee	Australia	3	0	0	0	0	2003
= 148	David Millar	United Kingdom	3	0	0	0	0	2000
= 148	Wilfried Nelissen	Belgium	3	0	0	0	0	1993
= 148	Jelle Nijdam	Netherlands	3	0	0	0	0	1987, 1988
= 148	Charles Pélissier	France	3	0	0	0	0	1930, 1931
= 148	Víctor Hugo Peña	Colombia	3	0	0	0	0	2003
= 148	René Privat	France	3	0	0	0	0	1957
= 148	Jan Raas (Note: Jan Raas won the prologue of the 1978 Tour de France. Because the weather changed dramatically during that prologue, the race was invalidated, and Raas was not awarded a yellow jersey. In cycling statistics lists, including the official database from the Tour de France organisation, the victory is awarded to Jan Raas, so this is also done in the list above.)	Netherlands	3	0	0	0	0	1978
= 148	Stephen Roche	Ireland	3	1	0	0	0	1987
= 148	Willy Schroeders	Belgium	3	0	0	0	0	1962
= 148	François Simon	France	3	0	0	0	0	2001
= 148	Julien Stevens	Belgium	3	0	0	0	0	1969
= 148	Teun van Vliet	Netherlands	3	0	0	0	0	1988
= 148	Michel Vermeulin	France	3	0	0	0	0	1959
= 148	David Zabriskie	United States	3	0	0	0	0	2005
= 175	Henry Anglade	France	2	0	0	0	0	1960
= 175	Fabio Aru	Italy	2	0	0	0	0	2017
= 175	Jan Bakelants	Belgium	2	0	0	0	0	2013
= 175	Romain Bellenger	France	2	0	0	0	0	1923
= 175	Rubens Bertogliati	Switzerland	2	0	0	0	0	2002
= 175	Eugeni Berzin	Russia	2	0	0	0	0	1996
= 175	Pierre Brambilla	Italy	2	0	0	1	0	1947
= 175	Jules Buysse	Belgium	2	0	0	0	0	1926
= 175	Marcel Buysse	Belgium	2	0	0	0	0	1913
= 175	Sylvain Chavanel	France	2	0	0	0	0	2010
= 175	Giulio Ciccone	Italy	2	0	0	1	0	2019
= 175	Charles Crupelandt	France	2	0	0	0	0	1910, 1912
= 175	Raymond Delisle	France	2	0	0	0	0	1976
= 175	Laurent Desbiens	France	2	0	0	0	0	1998
= 175	Jacky Durand	France	2	0	0	0	0	1995
= 175	Victor Fontan	France	2	0	0	0	0	1929
= 175	Jean Fontenay	France	2	0	0	0	0	1939
= 175	Jean Forestier	France	2	0	1	0	0	1957
= 175	Charly Gaul	Luxembourg	2	1	0	2	0	1958
= 175	Martial Gayant	France	2	0	0	0	0	1987
= 175	Albertus Geldermans	Netherlands	2	0	0	0	0	1962
= 175	Simon Gerrans	Australia	2	0	0	0	0	2013
= 175	Ivan Gotti	Italy	2	0	0	0	0	1995
= 175	Charly Grosskost	France	2	0	0	0	0	1968
= 175	Jacques Hanegraaf	Netherlands	2	0	0	0	0	1984
= 175	Ben Healy	Ireland	2	0	0	0	0	2025
= 175	Daryl Impey	South Africa	2	0	0	0	0	2013
= 175	Jan Janssen	Netherlands	2	1	3	0	0	1966, 1968
= 175	Gerben Karstens	Netherlands	2	0	0	0	0	1974
= 175	Marcel Kittel	Germany	2	0	0	0	0	2013, 2014
= 175	Georges Lemaire	Belgium	2	0	0	0	0	1933
= 175	Tony Martin	Germany	2	0	0	0	0	2015
= 175	Jules Masselis	Belgium	2	0	0	0	0	1911, 1913
= 175	Christophe Moreau	France	2	0	0	0	0	2001
= 175	Louis Mottiat	Belgium	2	0	0	0	0	1920, 1921
= 175	Georges Passerieu	France	2	0	0	0	0	1908
= 175	Ludo Peeters	Belgium	2	0	0	0	0	1982, 1984
= 175	Ronan Pensec	France	2	0	0	0	0	1990
= 175	Lech Piasecki	Poland	2	0	0	0	0	1987
= 175	Jean Robic	France	2	1	0	0	0	1947, 1953
= 175	Aldo Ronconi	Italy	2	0	0	0	0	1947
= 175	Fränk Schleck	Luxembourg	2	0	0	0	0	2008
= 175	Edward Sels	Belgium	2	0	0	0	0	1964
= 175	Mike Teunissen	Netherlands	2	0	0	0	0	2019
= 175	Klaus-Peter Thaler	Germany	2	0	0	0	0	1978
= 175	Torstein Træen	Norway	2	0	0	0	0	2026
= 175	Alejandro Valverde	Spain	2	0	0	0	0	2008
= 175	Johan van der Velde	Netherlands	2	0	0	0	1	1986
= 175	Rik Van Steenbergen	Belgium	2	0	0	0	0	1952
= 175	Flavio Vanzella	Italy	2	0	0	0	0	1994
= 175	Richard Virenque	France	2	0	0	7	0	1992, 2003
= 175	Jens Voigt	Germany	2	0	0	0	0	2001, 2005
= 175	Rolf Wolfshohl	Germany	2	0	0	0	0	1968
= 175	Erik Zabel	Germany	2	0	6	0	0	1998, 2002
= 229	Jean Aerts	Belgium	1	0	0	0	0	1932
= 229	Romain Bardet	France	1	0	0	1	0	2024
= 229	Nicolas Barone	France	1	0	0	0	0	1957
= 229	François Beaugendre	France	1	0	0	0	0	1904
= 229	Jean-François Bernard	France	1	0	0	0	0	1987
= 229	Jean-René Bernaudeau	France	1	0	0	0	1	1979
= 229	Yvon Bertin	France	1	0	0	0	0	1980
= 229	Serafino Biagioni	Italy	1	0	0	0	0	1951
= 229	Guido Bontempi	Italy	1	0	0	0	0	1988 (Note: In 1988, the Tour de France started with a prelude, a 1km time trial in which one cyclist from every team could compete. This prelude was won by Guido Bontempi, who wore the yellow jersey on the first real stage of the 1988 Tour.)
= 229	Vicenzo Borgarello	Italy	1	0	0	0	0	1912
= 229	Jacques Bossis	France	1	0	0	0	0	1978
= 229	Erik Breukink	Netherlands	1	0	0	0	1	1989
= 229	Johan Bruyneel	Belgium	1	0	0	0	0	1995
= 229	Max Bulla	Austria	1	0	0	0	0	1931
= 229	Norbert Callens	Belgium	1	0	0	0	0	1949
= 229	Richard Carapaz	Ecuador	1	0	0	2	0	2024
= 229	Andrea Carrea	Italy	1	0	0	0	0	1952
= 229	Mark Cavendish	United Kingdom	1	0	2	0	0	2016
= 229	Rohan Dennis	Australia	1	0	0	0	0	2015
= 229	Cyril Dessel	France	1	0	0	0	0	2006
= 229	Ferdinand Le Drogo	France	1	0	0	0	0	1927
= 229	Marcel Dussault	France	1	0	0	0	0	1949
= 229	Paul Egli	Switzerland	1	0	0	0	0	1936
= 229	Jan Engels	Belgium	1	0	0	0	0	1948
= 229	José María Errandonea	Spain	1	0	0	0	0	1967
= 229	Romain Feillu	France	1	0	0	0	0	2008
= 229	Amédée Fournier	France	1	0	0	0	0	1939
= 229	Michel Frédérick	Switzerland	1	0	0	0	0	1904
= 229	Dominique Gaigne	France	1	0	0	0	0	1986
= 229	Tony Gallopin	France	1	0	0	0	0	2014
= 229	Jean-Louis Gauthier	France	1	0	0	0	0	1983
= 229	Fernando Gaviria	Colombia	1	0	0	0	0	2018
= 229	Jean-Pierre Genet	France	1	0	0	0	0	1968
= 229	Linus Gerdemann	Germany	1	0	0	0	0	2007
= 229	Philippe Gilbert	Belgium	1	0	0	0	0	2011
= 229	Joseph Groussard	France	1	0	0	0	0	1960
= 229	Alfred Haemerlinck	Belgium	1	0	0	0	0	1931
= 229	Bo Hamburger	Denmark	1	0	0	0	0	1998
= 229	Hector Heusghem	Belgium	1	0	0	0	0	1922
= 229	George Hincapie	United States	1	0	0	0	0	2006
= 229	Jai Hindley	Australia	1	0	0	0	0	2023
= 229	Sean Kelly	Ireland	1	0	4	0	0	1983
= 229	Marcel Kint	Belgium	1	0	0	0	0	1937
= 229	Alexander Kristoff	Norway	1	0	0	0	0	2020
= 229	Yves Lampaert	Belgium	1	0	0	0	0	2022
= 229	Jean-Claude Lebaube	France	1	0	0	0	0	1966
= 229	Luc Leblanc	France	1	0	0	0	0	1991
= 229	Léon Le Calvez	France	1	0	0	0	0	1931
= 229	Désiré Letort	France	1	0	0	0	0	1969
= 229	Emile Lombard	Belgium	1	0	0	0	0	1904
= 229	Henk Lubberding	Netherlands	1	0	0	0	1	1988
= 229	François Mahé	France	1	0	0	0	0	1953
= 229	Robbie McEwen	Australia	1	0	3	0	0	2004
= 229	Arsène Mersch	Luxembourg	1	0	0	0	0	1936
= 229	Giovanni Micheletto	Italy	1	0	0	0	0	1913
= 229	Frédéric Moncassin	France	1	0	0	0	0	1996
= 229	Jean-Patrick Nazon	France	1	0	0	0	0	2003
= 229	Willi Oberbeck	Germany	1	0	0	0	0	1938
= 229	Jasper Philipsen	Belgium	1	0	1	0	0	2025
= 229	Miguel Poblet	Spain	1	0	0	0	0	1955
= 229	Giancarlo Polidori	Italy	1	0	0	0	0	1967
= 229	Tommaso de Pra	Italy	1	0	0	0	0	1966
= 229	Gaston Rebry	Belgium	1	0	0	0	0	1929
= 229	Raymond Riotte	France	1	0	0	0	0	1967
= 229	Giovanni Rossi	Switzerland	1	0	0	0	0	1951
= 229	Gregorio San Miguel	Spain	1	0	0	0	0	1968
= 229	Tom Simpson	United Kingdom	1	0	0	0	0	1962
= 229	Jozef Spruyt	Belgium	1	0	0	0	0	1967
= 229	Alex Stieda	Canada	1	0	0	0	0	1986
= 229	Kurt Stöpel	Germany	1	0	0	0	0	1932
= 229	Adri van der Poel	Netherlands	1	0	0	0	0	1984
= 229	Cyrille van Hauwaert	Belgium	1	0	0	0	0	1909
= 229	Rik Van Looy	Belgium	1	0	1	0	0	1965
= 229	Willy Van Neste	Belgium	1	0	0	0	0	1967
= 229	Marc Wauters	Belgium	1	0	0	0	0	2001
= 229	Sean Yates	United Kingdom	1	0	0	0	0	1994

== Number of wearers per year ==
The largest number of riders wearing the yellow jersey in any year is 8. The smallest is 1.

Number of wearers	Freq- uency	Years
1	6	1903, 1924, 1928, 1935, 1999, (Note: Results of Lance Armstrong annulled resulting in artificially only showing one single rider in yellow that year instead of two.) 2005 (Note: Results of Lance Armstrong and David Zabriskie annulled resulting in artificially only showing one single rider in yellow that year instead of three.)
2	14	1905, 1906, 1908, 1909, 1914, 1920, 1921, 1925, 1934, 1961, 1970, 1972, 1977, 2012
3	26	1907, 1910, 1911, 1912, 1919, 1926, 1930, 1932, 1933, 1954, 1965, 1971, 1974, 1975, 1976, 1981, 1982, 1985, 2000, (Note: Results of Lance Armstrong annulled resulting in artificially only showing three riders in yellow that year instead of four.) 2002, (Note: Results of Lance Armstrong annulled resulting in artificially only showing three riders in yellow that year instead of four.) 2009, 2014, 2017, 2021, 2023, 2024, 2026
4	25	1904, 1923, 1927, 1936, 1939, 1948, 1950, 1960, 1969, 1973, 1979, 1989, 1992, 1993, 1997, 2003, (Note: Results of Lance Armstrong annulled resulting in artificially only showing four riders in yellow that year instead of five.) 2004, (Note: Results of Lance Armstrong annulled resulting in artificially only showing four riders in yellow that year instead of five.) 2007, 2010, 2015, 2016, 2018, 2019, 2022, 2025
5	18	1913, 1922, 1938, 1947, 1952, 1955, 1957, 1963, 1964, 1980, 1990, 1991, 1994, 1996, 2001, (Note: Results of Lance Armstrong annulled resulting in artificially only showing five riders in yellow that year instead of six.) 2011, 2013, 2020
6	13	1929, 1931, 1937, 1953, 1956, 1959, 1966, 1967, 1983, 1984, 1988, 1995, 2008
7	8	1949, 1951, 1962, 1968, 1978, 1986, 1998, 2006
8	2	1958, 1987

== Per country ==
The yellow jersey has been awarded to 25 countries since 1903. In the table below, "Jerseys" indicates the number of yellow jerseys that were given to cyclists of each country. "Tour wins" stands for the number of tour wins by cyclists of that country, "Points" for the number of times the points classification was won by cyclist of that country, "Mountains" for the number of times the mountains classification in the Tour de France was won by a cyclist of that country, and "Young rider" for the number of times the young rider classification was won by a cyclist of that country. The "Most recent holder" column shows the cyclist of the country that wore the yellow jersey most recently. The "Different holders" column gives the number of cyclists of the country that wore the yellow jersey.

Rank	Country	Yellow jerseys	Tour wins	Points	Mountains	Young rider	Most recent holder	Stage	Different holders	List of holders
1	France	729	36	9	23	8	Romain Bardet	2024, stage 1	97	
2	Belgium	440	18	21	11	1	Jasper Philipsen	2025, stage 1	62	Belgian yellow jersey holders
3	Italy	212	10	3	13	5	Giulio Ciccone	2019, stage 7	30	
4	Spain	135	12	1	16	5	Alberto Contador	2009, stage 21	12	
5	Great Britain	108	6	2	2	2	Adam Yates	2023, stage 4	9	British yellow jersey holders
6	Luxembourg	98	5	0	2	3	Andy Schleck	2011, stage 19	10	
7	Netherlands	84	2	4	2	5	Mathieu van der Poel	2025, stage 6	18	Dutch yellow jersey holders
8	Slovenia	82	5	0	3	4	Tadej Pogačar	2026, stage 21	2	
9	Switzerland	74	2	2	1	0	Fabian Cancellara	2015, stage 2	10	
10=	Germany	72	1	8	0	5	Tony Martin	2015, stage 6	14	
10=	Denmark	72	3	1	3	0	Jonas Vingegaard	2026, stage 2	7	
12	Australia	34	1	5	0	1	Jai Hindley	2023, stage 5	8	Australian yellow jersey holders
13	United States	29	3	0	0	3	George Hincapie	2006, stage 1	4	
14	Canada	15	0	0	0	0	Steve Bauer	1990, stage 9	2	
15	Norway	13	0	2	0	0	Torstein Træen	2026, stage 5	3	
16	Ireland	9	1	5	0	0	Ben Healy	2025, stage 11	4	
17	Colombia	7	1	0	5	5	Egan Bernal	2019, stage 21	3	
18	Estonia	6	0	0	0	0	Jaan Kirsipuu	1999, stage 7	1	
=19	Portugal	4	0	0	0	0	Acácio da Silva	1989, stage 4	1	
=19	Slovakia	4	0	7	0	0	Peter Sagan	2018, stage 2	1	
21	Ukraine	3	0	0	0	1	Serhiy Honchar	2006, stage 9	1	
=22	Poland	2	0	0	2	0	Lech Piasecki	1987, stage 2	1	
=22	Russia	2	0	0	0	2	Eugeni Berzin	1996, stage 8	1	
=22	South Africa	2	0	0	0	0	Daryl Impey	2013, stage 7	1	
=25	Austria	1	0	0	0	0	Max Bulla	1931, stage 2	1	
=25	Ecuador	1	0	0	2	0	Richard Carapaz	2024, stage 4	1	
=27	Uzbekistan	0	0	3	0	0	–	–	0	
=27	Mexico	0	0	0	0	2	–	–	0	
=27	Eritrea	0	0	1	0	0	–	–	0	

== Yellow jersey retirees ==
There have been sixteen instances where a rider quit the Tour for any reason while wearing the yellow jersey.

Year	Stage	Rider	Reason
1927	6	(France) Francis Pélissier	Sickness
1929	10	(France) Victor Fontan	Broken bicycle
1937	16	(Belgium) Sylvère Maes	Collective withdrawal of the Belgian team due to threats from French spectators
1950	11	(Italy) Fiorenzo Magni	Collective withdrawal of the two Italian teams due to threats from French spectators
1951	13	(Netherlands) Wim van Est	Withdrawal after fall down a ravine in Aubisque
1965	9	(Belgium) Bernard Van De Kerkhove	Withdrawal during the climb of Aubisque (sunstroke)
1971	14	(Spain) Luis Ocaña	Fall during a storm in Col de Menté.
1978	16	(Belgium) Michel Pollentier	Expelled for attempting fraud at a doping test
1980	12	(France) Bernard Hinault	Knee pain
1983	17	(France) Pascal Simon	Scapula fracture
1991	5	(Denmark) Rolf Sørensen	Clavicle fracture after a fall in the last kilometer
1996	7	(France) Stéphane Heulot	Knee tendinitis
1998	2	(United Kingdom) Chris Boardman	Head and neck injury after a crash
2007	16	(Denmark) Michael Rasmussen	Sacked by his team for lying about his whereabouts
2015	4	(Switzerland) Fabian Cancellara	Broken vertebrae after a crash in Stage 3
2015	7	(Germany) Tony Martin	Broken collarbone after a crash in Stage 6

== Yellow jersey winners with no stage wins ==
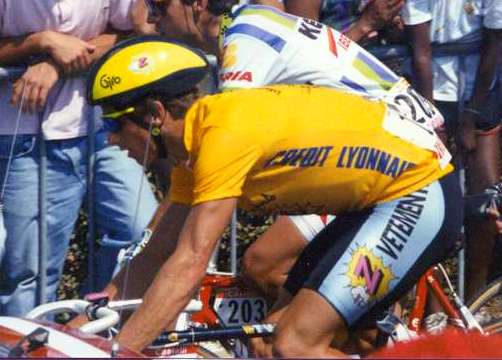
Greg LeMond in the final stage of the 1990 Tour de France, wearing the yellow jersey despite not winning any stage in that year.

Usually the winner of the Tour de France also wins at least one stage, but that is not necessary. It is possible to win the Tour de France without winning a single stage, because the overall winner of the Tour de France is decided solely by the total race time. This has happened eight times so far:

1. Firmin Lambot (BEL) 1922
2. Roger Walkowiak (FRA) 1956
3. Gastone Nencini (ITA) 1960
4. Lucien Aimar (FRA) 1966
5. Greg LeMond (USA) 1990
6. Óscar Pereiro (ESP) 2006
7. Chris Froome (GBR) 2017
8. Egan Bernal (COL) 2019

Of these eight cyclists, Walkowiak and Bernal are the only ones without a single Tour stage win, although Bernal is still active as of 2026, and was leading solo in the final stages of a stage abandoned due to a landslide on the final kilometres of the course in 2019, the year he won the Tour. Firmin Lambot won stages in the 1913, 1914, 1919, 1920 and 1921 Tours, Gastone Nencini won stages in the 1956, 1957 and 1958 Tours, Aimar won a stage in the 1967 Tour, LeMond won stages in the 1985, 1986 and 1989 Tours, Pereiro won a stage in the 2005 Tour, and Froome won stages in the 2012, 2013, 2015 and 2016 Tours. Alberto Contador initially also belonged to this group, when he won the 2010 Tour de France; however, he was later stripped of this title.

== Number of Tour winners in a single race ==
Every Tour de France only has one winner. But a cyclist that has won the Tour de France previously can enter the race again, and a cyclist not winning the race can win the race in a later year. In almost every Tour de France, there were multiple 'former or future' Tour de France-winners in the race. Only seven times, the Tour started without any former Tour de France winner. This happened in 1903, 1927, 1947, 1956, 1966, 1999 and 2006. Only in 1903, apart from the cyclist that won the race, was there no other former or future Tour de France winner.

In 1914, a record of seven former Tour de France winners started that year's Tour:

1. Louis Trousselier (FRA) (1905 winner)
2. Lucien Petit-Breton (FRA) (1907 and 1908 winner)
3. François Faber (LUX) (1909 winner)
4. Octave Lapize (FRA) (1910 winner)
5. Gustave Garrigou (FRA) (1911 winner)
6. Odile Defraye (BEL) (1912 winner)
7. Philippe Thys (BEL) (1913 winner, who would also win the 1914 and the 1920 editions)

In addition to these seven cyclists, four cyclists in that year's Tour would go on to win a Tour later:

1. Firmin Lambot (BEL) (1919 and 1922 winner)
2. Léon Scieur (BEL) (1921 winner)
3. Henri Pélissier (FRA) (1923 winner)
4. Lucien Buysse (BEL) (1926 winner)

== Winning Tour de France on first occasion ==
Twelve cyclists won the general classification the first time they entered the competition, including three of the five-time champions.

- 1903 – Maurice Garin (FRA) in the first ever Tour de France
- 1904 – Henri Cornet (FRA)
- 1905 – Louis Trousselier (FRA)
- 1947 – Jean Robic (FRA), first Tour after World War II
- 1949 – Fausto Coppi (ITA), first of his 2 victories
- 1951 – Hugo Koblet (SUI)
- 1957 – Jacques Anquetil (FRA), first of his 5 victories
- 1965 – Felice Gimondi (ITA)
- 1969 – Eddy Merckx (BEL), first of his 5 victories
- 1978 – Bernard Hinault (FRA), first of his 5 victories
- 1983 – Laurent Fignon (FRA), first of his 2 victories
- 2020 – Tadej Pogačar (SLO), first of his 5 victories

== Finishing Tour de France career with victory ==
Five cyclists won the Tour de France the last time they entered the competition:

- 1906 – René Pottier (FRA), died before next race
- 1937 – Roger Lapébie (FRA)
- 1939 – Sylvère Maes (BEL), last Tour before World War II
- 1952 – Fausto Coppi (ITA)
- 2012 – Bradley Wiggins (GBR)

Fausto Coppi is the only cyclist who won the Tour de France in both the first and the last Tour he entered.

== See also ==
- List of Australian cyclists who have led the Tour de France general classification
- List of Belgian cyclists who have led the Tour de France general classification
- List of British cyclists who have led the Tour de France general classification
- List of Dutch cyclists who have led the Tour de France general classification

== Bibliography ==
- Fotheringham, William (2012). Merckx: Half Man, Half Bike. London: Yellow Jersey Press. ISBN 978-0-224-07451-3.
