= List of Dutch cyclists who have led the Tour de France general classification =

In the Tour de France, one of the three Grand Tours of professional stage cycling, the yellow jersey is given to the leader of the general classification. The Tour de France is the most famous road cycling event in the world, and is held annually in the month of July. Although all riders compete together, the winners of the Tour are divided into classifications, each best known by the coloured jersey that is worn by the leader of it; the general classification (GC), represented by the maillot jaune (yellow jersey), is for the overall leader in terms of the lowest time. The other individual classifications in the Tour de France are the points classification, also known as the sprinters' classification (green jersey), the mountains classification (polka dot jersey), and the young rider classification (white jersey).

The first Tour de France was in 1903, but the first Dutch cyclists started only in 1936. Already in that first year, Theo Middelkamp won a stage, but it would take until 1951 before Wim van Est was the first Dutch cyclists to wear the yellow jersey. Between 1989 and 2019, the yellow jersey has never been worn by a Dutch cyclist.

== List ==
"Obtained" refers to the date and stage where the rider secured the lead of the general classification at the finish; the rider would first wear the yellow jersey in the stage after, where he would start the day as leader. "Relinquished" refers to the date and stage where the rider lost the lead, and therefore was not wearing the yellow jersey the following stage.

List of Dutch cyclists who wore the yellow jersey
Year	Name	Team	Obtained		Relinquished		Final GC	Notes
Year	Name	Team	Stage	Date	Stage	Date	Final GC	Notes
1951	Wim van Est	Netherlands	12, Agen — Dax	July 16, 1951	13, Dax — Tarbes	July 17, 1951	DNF (stage 13)	^{[A]}
1954	Wout Wagtmans	Netherlands	1, Amsterdam — Brasschaat	July 8, 1954	4, Rouen-Les-Essarts — Rouen-Les-Essarts	July 11, 1954	DNF (stage 20)	
1954	Wout Wagtmans	Netherlands	8, Vannes — Angers	July 15, 1954	12, Pau — Bagnères-de-Luchon	July 20, 1954	DNF (stage 20)	
1955	Wout Wagtmans	Netherlands	1B, Dieppe — Dieppe	July 7, 1955	4, Namur — Metz	July 10, 1955	19	
1955	Wim van Est	Netherlands	7, Zürich — Thonon-les-Bains	July 13, 1955	8, Thonon-les-Bains — Briançon	July 14, 1955	15	
1956	Gerrit Voorting	Netherlands	11, Bordeaux — Bayonne	July 15, 1956	12, Bayonne — Pau	July 16, 1956	11	
1956	Wout Wagtmans	Netherlands	15, Montpellier — Aix-en-Provence	July 20, 1956	18, Turin — Briançon	July 24, 1956	6	
1958	Wim van Est	Netherlands	3, Dunkirk — Mers-les-Bains	June 28, 1958	5, Versailles — Caen	June 30, 1958	46	
1958	Gerrit Voorting	Netherlands	6, Caen — Saint-Brieuc	July 1, 1958	9, Quimper — Saint-Nazaire	July 4, 1958	47	
1962	Albertus Geldermans	Saint-Raphaël	6, Dinard — Brest	June 29, 1962	8A, Saint-Nazaire — Luçon	July 1, 1962	5	
1966	Jan Janssen	Pelforth	16, le Bourg-d'Oisans — Briançon	July 7, 1966	17, Briançon — Turin	July 8, 1966	2	
1968	Jan Janssen	Netherlands	22B, Melun — Paris	July 22, 1968			1	^{[B]}
1971	Marinus Wagtmans	Molteni	1B, Vittel — Esch-sur-Alzette	June 27, 1971	1C, Esch-sur-Alzette — Esch-sur-Alzette	June 27, 1971	16	^{[C]}
1971	Joop Zoetemelk	Flandria	10, Saint-Étienne — Grenoble	July 7, 1971	11, Grenoble — Orcières-Merlette	July 8, 1971	2	
1973	Joop Zoetemelk	Gitane	P, Scheveningen — Scheveningen	June 30, 1973	1A, Scheveningen — Rotterdam	July 1, 1973	4	^{[D]}
1974	Gerben Karstens	Bic	5, Caen — Dieppe	July 2, 1974	6A, Dieppe — Harelbeke	July 2, 1974	61	
1974	Gerben Karstens	Bic	6B, Harelbeke — Harelbeke	July 3, 1974	7, Mons — Châlons-sur-Marne	July 4, 1974	61	
1978	Jan Raas	Raleigh	1A, Leiden — Sint Willebrord	June 30, 1978	3, Saint-Amand-les-Eaux — Saint-Germain-en-Laye	July 2, 1978	24	^{[E]}
1978	Gerrie Knetemann	Raleigh	6, Mazé-Montgeoffroy — Poitiers	July 5, 1978	8, Saint-Émilion — Sainte-Foy-la-Grande	July 7, 1978	43	
1978	Joop Zoetemelk	Miko	16, Saint-Étienne — L'Alpe d'Huez	July 16, 1978	20, Metz — Nancy	July 21, 1978	2	^{[F]}
1979	Gerrie Knetemann	Raleigh	P, Fleurance — Fleurance	June 27, 1979	1, Fleurance — Bagnères-de-Luchon	June 28, 1979	30	
1979	Joop Zoetemelk	Miko	9, Amiens — Roubaix	July 6, 1979	15, Évian-les-Bains — Avoriaz	July 12, 1979	2	
1980	Gerrie Knetemann	Raleigh	1B, Wiesbaden — Frankfurt am Main	June 27, 1980	2, Frankfurt am Main — Metz	June 28, 1980	38	
1980	Joop Zoetemelk	Raleigh	13, Pau — Bagnères-de-Luchon	July 10, 1980			1	^{[G]}
1981	Gerrie Knetemann	Raleigh	1B, Nice — Nice	June 26, 1981	5, Saint-Gaudens — Pla d'Adet	June 30, 1981	55	
1984	Jacques Hanegraaf	Kwantum	2, Bobigny — Louvroil	July 1, 1984	4, Valenciennes — Béthune	July 2, 1984	101	
1984	Adri van der Poel	Kwantum	4, Valenciennes — Béthune	July 2, 1984	5, Béthune — Cergy-Pontoise	July 3, 1984	DNF (stage 14)	
1986	Johan van der Velde	Panasonic–Merckx–Agu	5, Béthune — Cergy-Pontoise	July 8, 1986	7, Alençon — le Mans	July 10, 1986	52	
1987	Jelle Nijdam	SuperConfex	P, Berlin — Berlin	July 1, 1987	1, Berlin — Berlin	July 2, 1987	124	
1988	Teun van Vliet	Panasonic–Isostar–Colnago–Agu	2, la Haie-Fouassière — Ancenis	July 4, 1988	5, Neufchâtel-en-Bray — Liévin	July 7, 1988	DNF (stage 9)	
1988	Henk Lubberding	Panasonic–Isostar–Colnago–Agu	5, Neufchâtel-en-Bray — Liévin	July 7, 1988	6, Liévin — Wasquehal	July 8, 1988	DNF (stage 20)	
1988	Jelle Nijdam	SuperConfex	6, Liévin — Wasquehal	July 7, 1988	8, Reims — Nancy	July 9, 1988	122	
1989	Erik Breukink	Panasonic–Isostar–Colnago–Agu	P, Luxembourg — Luxembourg	July 1, 1989	1, Luxembourg — Luxembourg	July 2, 1989	DNF (stage 13)	
2019	Mike Teunissen	Team Jumbo–Visma	1, Brussels — Brussels	July 6, 2019	3, Binche — Épernay	July 8, 2019	101	
2021	Mathieu van der Poel	Alpecin–Fenix	2, Perros-Guirec — Mûr-de-Bretagne	June 27, 2021	8, Oyonnax — Le Grand-Bornand	July 2, 2021	DNF (stage 9)	
2025	Mathieu van der Poel	Alpecin–Deceuninck	2, Lauwin-Planque — Boulogne-sur-Mer	July 6, 2025	5, Caen — Caen	July 9, 2025	DNS (stage 16)	
2025	Mathieu van der Poel	Alpecin–Deceuninck	6, Bayeux – Vire Normandie	July 10, 2025	7, Saint-Malo – Mûr-de-Bretagne	July 11, 2025	DNS (stage 16)	

== See also ==
- List of Australian cyclists who have led the Tour de France general classification
- List of Belgian cyclists who have led the Tour de France general classification
- List of British cyclists who have led the Tour de France general classification
- Yellow jersey statistics

== Notes ==
A.: The first time a Dutch cyclist wore the yellow jersey. Van Est had to give up after falling.
B.: Janssen was the first Dutch winner of the Tour de France.
C.: Wagtmans was leader after the split stage 1B, but not anymore after 1C. In some references, this is not counted as a day in the lead.
D.: P indicates the prologue.
E.: Jan Raas had also won the prologue, but the tour organisation decided not to count that prologue for the general classification because the weather had changed during the race.
F.: Zoetemelk was upgraded to first place after Michel Pollentier was caught in a doping incident.
G.: Zoetemelk was the second Dutch winner of the Tour de France.
