= 1998 PruTour =

Race details
- Dates: 23–31 May 1998
- Stages: 8 + Prologue
- Winning time: 27h 17' 53"

Results
	Winner	Stuart O'Grady (AUS)	(GAN)
	Second	Chris Boardman (GBR)	(GAN)
	Third	Dariusz Baranowski (POL)	(U.S. Postal Service)

The 1998 PruTour was the first edition of the Prudential Tour of Britain cycle race and was held from 23 May to 31 May 1998. The race started in Stirling and finished in London. The race was won by Stuart O'Grady of the GAN team.

== Route ==
Stage characteristics and winners
Stage	Date	Course	Distance	Type	Winner
P	23 May	Stirling	4.2 km (2.6 mi)	Individual time trial	Chris Boardman (GBR)
1	24 May	Edinburgh to Newcastle	210 km (130.5 mi)		Chris Boardman (GBR)
2	25 May	Gateshead to York	182 km (113.1 mi)		Stuart O'Grady (AUS)
3	26 May	Manchester to Blackpool	186 km (115.6 mi)		Jay Sweet (AUS)
4	27 May	Chester to Nottingham	153 km (95.1 mi)	Hilly stage	Julian Winn (GBR)
5	28 May	Birmingham ~~to Cardiff~~	58 km (36.0 mi) (Note: The stage was planned to be 207 km (129 mi), but was abandoned after a fatal accident involving a police escort.)		None
6	29 May	Bristol to Reading	146 km (90.7 mi)		Viatcheslav Ekimov (RUS)
7	30 May	Chessington to Rochester	161 km (100.0 mi)		Stuart O'Grady (AUS)
8	31 May	London criterium	170 km (105.6 mi)	Flat stage	Jay Sweet (AUS)

== Teams ==
Eighteen teams of six riders started the race:

- GAN
- Festina–Lotus
- U.S. Postal Service
- BigMat–Auber 93
- Oilme
- Team Brite Voice
- Linda McCartney On Tour
- Great Britain
- England
- Scotland
- Wales
- Ireland
- Denmark
- New Zealand
- Netherlands
- Australia
- South Africa
- Mobilvetta Design–Northwave

== General classification ==
Final general classification

Rank	Rider	Team	Time
1	Stuart O'Grady (AUS)	GAN	27h 17' 53"
2	Chris Boardman (GBR)	GAN	+ 46"
3	Dariusz Baranowski (POL)	U.S. Postal Service	+ 57"
4	Neil Stephens (AUS)	Festina–Lotus	+ 1' 14"
5	Tyler Hamilton (USA)	U.S. Postal Service	+ 1' 32"
6	Carlos Da Cruz (FRA)	BigMat–Auber 93	+ 1' 33"
7	Stéphane Bergès (FRA)	BigMat–Auber 93	+ 1' 52"
8	Chris Newton (GBR)	Team Brite Voice	+ 1' 52"
9	Magnus Bäckstedt (SWE)	GAN	+ 2' 15"
10	Nicki Sørensen (DEN)	Denmark	+ 2' 37"
