= Active Travel England =

Active Travel promotion organisation of the UK Government

- Abbreviation: ATE
- Formation: Announced 28 July 2020; 6 years ago
- Founded at: York
- Type: Executive agency
- Purpose: Promoting walking and cycling in England
- Active Travel Commissioner for England: Chris Boardman
- Chief Executive: Danny Williams
- Parent organisation: Department for Transport
- Website: https://www.activetravelengland.gov.uk/

Active Travel England (ATE) is the executive agency responsible for active travel in England and is part of the UK Department for Transport. The organisation is an inspectorate and funding body led by Chris Boardman, the first Active Travel Commissioner for England.

== Background ==
On 28 July 2020, the Government of the United Kingdom announced the establishment of Active Travel England as part of a new cycling and walking plan called Gear Change: A bold vision for cycling and walking.

Active Travel England was formally established in 2022.

== Functions ==
The functions of the organisation are:

- Enforce of new cycling design guidance by local authorities
- Provide advice to improve scheme design, implementation and stakeholder management
- As of 2023, statutory consultation for planning applications for all developments over 150 dwellings
- Consider applications for funding from the cycling budget (£2bn initially)
- Publish annual reports on highway authorities, grading them on their performance on active travel

The organisation has a role in inspecting local roads.

== Funding and effectiveness ==
The DfT released £250 million in May 2020 and £175 million in November 2020 to fund active travel infrastructure schemes. It was reviewed by the National Audit Office in 2023.

The organisation publishes a ranking of how effective councils are at using its funding.

== See also ==
- Sustrans, UK active travel charity
- National Cycle Network
- Cycling England (2005–2011), former government body
