= List of British cyclists who have led the Tour de France general classification =

The 1962 Tour de France design of the yellow jersey, as worn by Tom Simpson on stage thirteen as leader of the general classification

Since the establishment of the competition in 1903, nine British riders have led the general classification in the Tour de France at the end of a stage during one of the 103 editions of the Tours de France. As of the end of the 2018 Tour, this equals a total of 101 stages.

== History ==
One of the three Grand Tours of professional road bicycle racing, the Tour de France is the most famous road cycling event in the world, and is held annually around the month of July. Although all riders compete together, the winners of the Tour are divided into classifications, each best known by the coloured jersey that is worn by the leader of it; the general classification (GC), represented by the yellow jersey (French: maillot jaune), is for the overall leader in terms of the lowest time. The other individual classifications in the Tour are the points classification, commonly seen as the sprinters' classification (green jersey), the mountains classification (polka dot jersey), and the young rider classification (white jersey).

The first British rider to wear the yellow jersey was Tom Simpson in 1962, after he finished in the leading group of riders on stage twelve from Pau to Saint-Gaudens. He lost the lead in the following stage's mountain time trial. Thirty-two years later, at the 1994 Tour, Chris Boardman won the opening prologue in Lille. He wore yellow for the next three stages until the end of the team time trial on stage three. On the sixth stage from Cherbourg to Rennes, Sean Yates then took the lead of the race, holding yellow for one stage. In 1997, Boardman again took the yellow jersey after he won the prologue in Rouen. He lost it in the following stage that, although finished in a bunch sprint, awarded a time bonus to the winner. He came back the next year to win the prologue in Dublin. He held it until stage two when he crashed out of the race. In 2000, David Millar won the opening individual time trial in Futuroscope to hold yellow until stage four's team time trial.

The next British rider to lead the general classification was Bradley Wiggins in 2012, after he placed second behind compatriot and teammate Chris Froome on stage seven's summit finish at the La Planche des Belles Filles ski station. Wiggins held the yellow jersey until the end of the Tour to become the first Briton to win the race. Froome came in second overall, and the following year went one better and won the Tour after gaining and holding the lead to the end after his victory on stage eight's mountain course from Castres to Ax 3 Domaines. After he was forced to retire due to an injury in 2014, Froome came back in 2015, and on stage three's summit finish at Huy claimed the yellow jersey, although he lost it the following day after a solo win from German rider Tony Martin. Froome took the yellow jersey back from Martin after he retired from the Tour after stage six. No rider wore yellow for the seven stage as Martin had finished the stage, so Froome held it after the seventh; he defended it until the conclusion of the race to win his second Tour. He also claimed the mountains classification, the first time a rider had won both in the same year since Eddy Merckx in 1970. In 2016, Mark Cavendish won the opening stage's bunch sprint at Utah Beach to become the seventh British rider to wear yellow. He lost the jersey after the next stage's uphill sprint finish. Froome's solo victory after the descent into Bagnères-de-Luchon saw him take the race lead, which he held to the end of the Tour and win his third title.

== List ==
"Obtained" refers to the date and stage where the rider secured the lead of the general classification at the finish; the rider would first wear the yellow jersey in the stage after, where he would start the day as leader. "Relinquished" refers to the date and stage where the rider lost the lead, and therefore was not wearing the yellow jersey the following stage.

Year	Name	Team	Obtained		Relinquished		Final GC	Notes	Ref
Year	Name	Team	Stage	Date	Stage	Date	Final GC	Notes	Ref
1962	Tom Simpson	Gitane–Leroux–Dunlop–R. Geminiani	12, Pau to Saint-Gaudens	5 July 1962	13, Luchon to Superbagnères	6 July 1962	6th (+ 17' 09")		
1994	Chris Boardman	GAN	P, (Note: "P" refers to the prologue stage, most commonly an individual time trial (as it was in 1994, 1997 and 1998). The prologue is not considered to be a numbered stage of the Tour de France, and is followed the next day by Stage "1"; therefore, the prologue is occasionally also designated as Stage "0".) Lille	2 July 1994	3, Calais to Eurotunnel	5 July 1994	DNF-11	(Note: Also won the green jersey as the winner of opening stage.)	
1994	Sean Yates	Motorola	6, Cherbourg to Rennes	8 July 1994	7, Rennes to Futuroscope	9 July 1994	71st (+ 2h 04' 45")		
1997	Chris Boardman	GAN	P, Rouen	5 July 1997	1, Rouen to Forges-les-Eaux	6 July 1997	DNF-13		
1998	Chris Boardman	GAN	P, Dublin	11 July 1998	2, Enniscorthy to Cork	13 July 1998	DNF-3		
2000	David Millar	Cofidis	1, Futuroscope	1 July 2003	4, Nantes to Saint-Nazaire	4 July 2003	62nd (+ 2h 13' 03")	(Note: Also won both the green jersey and the white jersey as the winner of opening stage.)	
2012	Bradley Wiggins	Team Sky	7, Tomblaine to La Planche des Belles Filles	7 July 2012	(winner)		1st		
2013	Chris Froome	Team Sky	8, Castres to Ax 3 Domaines	7 July 2013	(winner)		1st		
2015	Chris Froome	Team Sky	3, Antwerp to Huy	6 July 2015	4, Seraing to Cambrai	7 July 2015	1st	(Note: Finished first in the mountains classification at the completion of the Tour.)	
2015	Chris Froome	Team Sky	7, Livarot to Fougères	10 July 2015	(winner)		1st	(Note: Finished first in the mountains classification at the completion of the Tour.)	
2016	Mark Cavendish	Team Dimension Data	1, Mont Saint-Michel to Sainte-Marie-du-Mont	2 July 2016	2, Saint-Lô to Cherbourg-Octeville	3 July 2016	DNS-17		
2016	Chris Froome	Team Sky	8, Pau to Bagnères-de-Luchon	9 July 2016	(winner)		1st		
2017	Geraint Thomas	Team Sky	1, Düsseldorf	1 July 2017	5, Vittel to La Planche des Belles Filles	5 July 2017	DNF-9		
2017	Chris Froome	Team Sky	5, Vittel to La Planche des Belles Filles	5 July 2017	12, Pau to Peyragudes	13 July 2017	1st		
2017	Chris Froome	Team Sky	14, Blagnac to Rodez	15 July 2017	(winner)		1st		
2018	Geraint Thomas	Team Sky	11, Albertville to La Rosière	18 July 2018	(winner)		1st		
2020	Adam Yates	Mitchelton–Scott	5, Gap to Privas	2 September 2020	9, Pau to Laruns	6 September 2020	9th		
2023	Adam Yates	UAE Team Emirates	1, Bilbao	1 July 2023	5, Pau to Laruns	5 July 2023	3rd		

== See also ==
- List of Australian cyclists who have led the Tour de France general classification
- List of British cyclists
- List of Dutch cyclists who have led the Tour de France general classification
- Yellow jersey statistics
