= List of Australian cyclists who have led the Tour de France general classification =

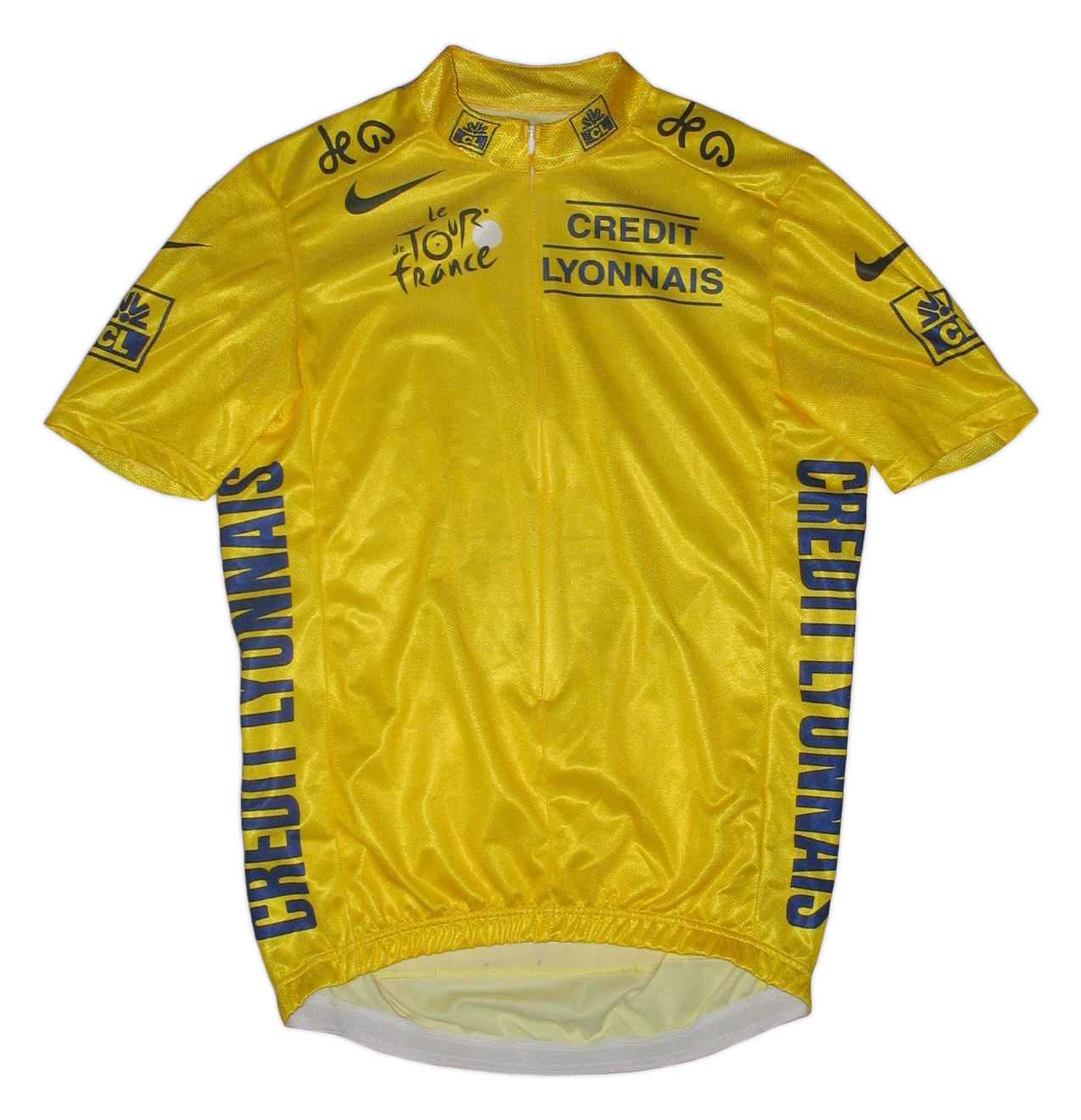
The 2004 design of the yellow jersey for the leader of the general classification, as worn by Robbie McEwen on Stage 3 as leader of the general classification

Since the establishment of the competition in 1903, eight Australians have led the general classification in the Tour de France at the end of a stage during one of the 102 Tours de France. One of the three Grand Tours of professional stage road cycling, the Tour de France is the most famous road cycling event in the world, and is held annually in the month of July. Although all riders compete together, the winners of the Tour are divided into classifications, each best known by the coloured jersey that is worn by the leader of it; the general classification (GC), represented by the yellow jersey (French: maillot jaune), is for the overall leader in terms of the lowest time. The other individual classifications in the Tour de France are the points classification, also known as the sprinters' classification (green jersey), the mountains classification (polka dot jersey), and the young rider classification (white jersey).

In the 110 editions of the Tour de France to 2023, only eight Australian riders have worn the yellow jersey. The first was Phil Anderson, who in 1981 became the first ever non-European to lead the general classification at the Tour de France when he wore the yellow jersey on Stage 7 on 1 July. Of the eight Australians to wear it to date, four are considered to be "general classification riders" (that is, riders who are aiming to win the GC, as opposed to competing in another classification or riding as a domestique): Anderson in 1981 and 1982, Cadel Evans in 2008, 2010 and 2011, Simon Gerrans in 2013 and Jai Hindley in 2023. Stuart O'Grady and Robbie McEwen are sprint specialists, and were successful in the points classification competition in the years when they also wore the yellow jersey; as a result of winning stages early in the race, they received time bonuses which gave them the leadership of the GC for a small number of days early in the Tour. Brad McGee was the reigning world champion in the 4000 m individual pursuit when he won the opening prologue time trial, which was similar in length, in 2003. Simon Gerrans gained his Yellow Jersey after Orica–GreenEDGE's victory in the Stage 4 team time trial around Nice on 2 July 2013. Rohan Dennis, while a former hour record holder, was riding the Tour de France in support of Tejay van Garderen when he won the Stage 1 individual time trial in Utrecht on 4 July 2015, thus becoming the first leader of the general classification for the 2015 Tour de France.

The eight Australians have spent a total of 32 stages in the yellow jersey out of the 2,126 total in the 102 editions of the Tour de France, as at the end of Stage 1 of the 2015 Tour.

== List ==
"Obtained" refers to the date and stage where the rider secured the lead of the general classification at the finish; the rider would first wear the yellow jersey in the stage after, where he would start the day as leader. "Relinquished" refers to the date and stage where the rider lost the lead, and therefore was not wearing the yellow jersey the following stage.

Year	Name	Team	Obtained		Relinquished		Final GC	Notes
Year	Name	Team	Stage	Date	Stage	Date	Final GC	Notes
1981	Phil Anderson	Peugeot	6, Gaudens–Pla d'Adet	30 June 1981	7, Nay–Pau	1 July 1981	10th (+27'00")	^{[A]}
1982	Phil Anderson	Peugeot	2, Bâle–Nancy	4 July 1982	11, Valence d'Agen	14 July 1982	5th (+12'16")	^{[B]}
1998	Stuart O'Grady	GAN	3, Roscoff–Lorient	14 July 1998	6, La Châtre–Brive-la-Gaillarde	17 July 1998	53rd (+106'04")	^{[C]}
2001	Stuart O'Grady	GAN	2, Calais–Antwerp	9 July 2001	6, Commercy–Strasbourg	13 July 2001	54th (+96'20")	^{[C]}
2001	Stuart O'Grady	GAN	7, Strasbourg–Colmar	14 July 2001	9, Pontarlier–Aix-les-Bains	16 July 2001	54th (+96'20")	^{[C]}
2003	Bradley McGee	FDJeux	P,^{[D]} Paris	5 July 2003	3, Charleville-Mézières–Saint-Dizier	8 July 2003	133rd (+232'49")	
2004	Robbie McEwen	Lotto–Domo	2, Charleroi–Namur	5 July 2004	3, Waterloo–Wasquehal	6 July 2004	122nd (+179'18")	^{[E]}
2008	Cadel Evans	Silence–Lotto	10, Pau–Hautacam	14 July 2008	15, Embrun–Prato Nevoso	20 July 2008	2nd (+0'58")	
2010	Cadel Evans	BMC	8, Station des Rousses–Morzine–Avoriaz	11 July 2010	9, Morzine–Avoriaz–Saint-Jean-de-Maurienne	13 July 2010	26th (+50' 27")	
2011	Cadel Evans	BMC	20, Grenoble – Grenoble	23 July 2011	(winner)		1st	
2013	Simon Gerrans	Orica–GreenEDGE	4, Nice–Nice	2 July 2013	6, Aix-en-Provence–Montpellier	4 July 2013	80th (+ 02h 34' 36')	
2015	Rohan Dennis	BMC Racing Team	1, Utrecht–Utrecht	4 July 2015	2, Utrecht–Neeltje Jans	5 July 2015	N/A (N/A)	^{[F]}
2023	Jai Hindley	Bora–Hansgrohe	5, Pau–Laruns	5 July 2023	6, Tarbes–Cauterets	6 July 2023	7th (+ 14' 44")	

== Notes ==
A.: This was the first time a non-European cyclist was leader of the general classification.
B.: Finished first in the young rider classification at the completion of the Tour.
C. ^{a} ^{b} : Finished second in the points classification at the completion of the Tour.
D.: "P" refers to the prologue event, most commonly an individual time trial (as it was in 2003). The prologue is not considered to be a numbered stage of the Tour de France, and is followed the next day by Stage "1"; therefore, the prologue is occasionally also designated as Stage "0".
E.: Finished first in the points classification at the completion of the Tour.
F.: Also won both the Green Points Jersey and the White Young Rider Jersey as the winner of Stage 1.

== See also ==
- Australian cyclists at the Tour de France
- List of British cyclists who have led the Tour de France general classification
- List of Dutch cyclists who have led the Tour de France general classification
- Yellow jersey statistics
