= 1994 UCI Road World Championships – Men's time trial =

Men's time trial
1994 UCI Road World Championships
- ITT rainbow jersey

Race details
- Dates: 25 August 1994
- Stages: 1
- Winning time: 49:34

Medalists
	Gold	Chris Boardman (GBR)
	Silver	Andrea Chiurato (ITA)
	Bronze	Jan Ullrich (GER)

The men's individual time trial (ITT) made its world championship debut on 25 August 1994 in Agrigento/Catania, Italy. It was added to the programme as a replacement for the team time trial.

The inaugural title was claimed by Chris Boardman, who also won the individual pursuit in that year's Track Cycling World Championships.

== Final classification ==
Rank	Rider	Time
1st place, gold medalist(s)	Chris Boardman (GBR)	49:34
2nd place, silver medalist(s)	Andrea Chiurato (ITA)	+ 0:48
3rd place, bronze medalist(s)	Jan Ullrich (GER)	+ 1:51
4	Erik Breukink (NED)	+ 2:03
5	Abraham Olano (ESP)	+ 2:16
6	Nico Emonds (BEL)	+ 2:19
7	Thierry Marie (FRA)	+ 2:32
8	Henk Vogels (AUS)	+ 2:41
9	Zenon Jaskuła (POL)	+ 2:51
10	Michael Rich (GER)	+ 3:05
11	Jan Karlsson (SWE)	+ 3:09
12	Melcior Mauri (ESP)	+ 3:18
13	Alex Zülle (SUI)	+ 3:21
14	Stephen Hodge (AUS)	+ 3:27
15	František Trkal (CZE)	+ 3:32
16	Magnus Åström (SWE)	+ 3:37
17	Scott Mercier (USA)	+ 3:43
18	Nico Mattan (BEL)	+ 3:51
19	Serhiy Honchar (UKR)	+ 4:00
20	Luca Colombo (ITA)	+ 4:02
21	Evgeni Berzin (RUS)	+ 4:19
22	Servais Knaven (NED)	+ 4:32
23	Henrik Jacobsen (DEN)	+ 4:34
24	Artūras Kasputis (LTU)	+ 4:36
25	Pavel Padrnos (CZE)	+ 4:38
26	Eddy Seigneur (FRA)	+ 4:41
27	Jan-Bo Petersen (DEN)	+ 4:41
28	Ruben Antonio Pegorin (ARG)	+ 4:47
29	Ruslan Ivanov (MDA)	+ 5:03
30	Graeme Obree (GBR)	+ 5:20
31	Roman Jeker (SUI)	+ 5:36
32	Miroslav Lipták (SVK)	+ 5:41
33	Julio César Ortegón Luque (COL)	+ 5:42
34	Bernard Bocian (POL)	+ 5:44
35	Jacques Landry (CAN)	+ 5:46
36	Philip Collins (IRL)	+ 5:50
37	Mika Hietanen (FIN)	+ 5:54
38	Clay Moseley (USA)	+ 5:55
39	Igor Patenko (BLR)	+ 6:06
40	Stig Kristiansen (NOR)	+ 6:12
41	Sandi Papez (SLO)	+ 6:21
42	Serguei Ljboldine (RUS)	+ 6:23
43	Gorazd Štangelj (SLO)	+ 6:38
44	Igor Bonciucov (MDA)	+ 6:40
45	Markus Pinggera (AUT)	+ 6:59
46	Kari Myyryläinen (FIN)	+ 7:13
47	Volodimyr Duma (UKR)	+ 7:42
48	Raúl Montaña (COL)	+ 8:12
49	Gyorgy Imris (HUN)	+ 8:38
50	Dietmar Dietmar (AUT)	+ 8:47
51	Attila Szabo (HUN)	+ 10:59
52	Samir Kovacevic (BIH)	+ 11:10
53	Christian Koujoumjian (LBN)	+ 11:19
54	Agim Tafili (ALB)	+ 11:35
55	Agim Paja (ALB)	+ 13:00
56	Refik Ramic (BIH)	+ 13:09
57	Abdelouahed Latrach (MAR)	+ 13:18
