= Chris Boardman =

British racing cyclist (born 1968)

Chris Boardman CBE
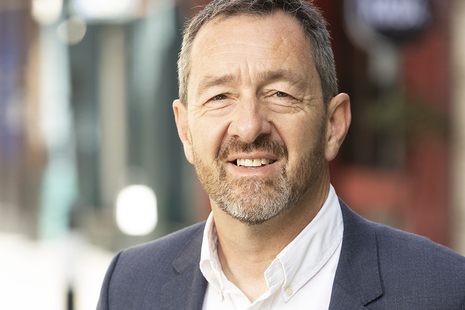
- Boardman in 2022

Personal information
- Full name: Christopher Miles Boardman
- Nickname: The Professor
- Born: 26 August 1968 (age 58) Hoylake, Merseyside, England
- Height: 1.75 m (5 ft 9 in)
- Weight: 70 kg (154 lb; 11 st 0 lb)

Cycling career
- Sport: Cycling
- Disciplines: Road and track
- Rider type: Time trialist

Amateur teams
- –: Birkenhead Victoria CC
- –: Manchester Wheelers' Club
- –: GS Strada
- –: North Wirral Velo Club-Kodak

Professional teams
- 1993–1998: GAN
- 1999–2000: Crédit Agricole

Major wins
- Road Grand Tours Tour de France 3 individual stages (1994, 1997, 1998) Stage races Critérium International (1996) One-day races and Classics World Time Trial Championships (1994) Track Olympic Games Individual pursuit (1992) World Championships Individual pursuit (1994, 1996) Hour record holder (1993, 1996, 2000)
Medal record
Representing Great Britain
Olympic Games
Men's track cycling
Gold medal – first place	1992 Barcelona	Individual pursuit
Men's road bicycle racing
Bronze medal – third place	1996 Atlanta	Time trial
World Championships
Men's track cycling
Gold medal – first place	1994 Palermo	Individual pursuit
Gold medal – first place	1996 Manchester	Individual pursuit
Bronze medal – third place	1993 Hamar	Individual pursuit
Men's road bicycle racing
Gold medal – first place	1994 Agrigento	Time trial
Silver medal – second place	1996 Lugano	Time trial
Bronze medal – third place	1997 San Sebastian	Time trial
Bronze medal – third place	1999 Treviso	Time trial
Representing England
Commonwealth Games
Bronze medal – third place	Edinburgh 1986	Team pursuit
Bronze medal – third place	Auckland 1990	Team pursuit
Bronze medal – third place	Auckland 1990	Team time trial

Christopher Miles Boardman, CBE (born 26 August 1968) is an English former racing cyclist. A time trial and prologue specialist, Boardman won the inaugural men's World time trial championship in 1994, won the individual pursuit gold medal at the 1992 Summer Olympics, broke the world hour record three times, and won three prologue stages (and consequently wore the yellow jersey on three occasions) at the Tour de France.

Boardman used the Lotus 108 time trial bicycle designed by Mike Burrows and built by the sports car manufacturer Lotus. Later he worked with the UK carbon fibre bike specialist Hotta, to produce other time-trial frame designs, which he raced in various events including world championships, and Olympic games. He is now involved in producing commercial and competition bikes with the Boardman Bikes and Boardman Elite ventures.

Boardman has also worked to promote walking and cycling across the UK, becoming Greater Manchester's walking and cycling commissioner in 2017, Greater Manchester's Transport Commissioner in 2021 and most recently, Commissioner of Active Travel England.

In 1992, he was awarded an MBE for services to cycling. Boardman was appointed Commander of the Order of the British Empire (CBE) in 2024 Birthday Honours for services to active travel.

== Early life and amateur career ==
Boardman was educated at Hilbre High School in Wirral, Merseyside, and rode in his first bike race at the age of 13. He was on the national cycling team by the age of 16.

Boardman won his first national time trial title in the 1984 "George Herbert Stancer" schoolboy 10-mile championship and subsequently won the 1986 junior 25-mile championship. He also broke the junior 25-mile national record in 1984.

As a senior he won four consecutive hill climb championships (from 1988 to 1991), five consecutive 25-mile championships (from 1989 to 1993), the 50-mile championship in 1991 and 1992, and the men's British time trial championship in 2000. He broke the record for 25 miles in 1992 and 1993 with 45 minutes 57 seconds (which he held until 2009) on a course based on the A34 near Oxford. He was also a member of the winning North Wirral Velo team in the 1993 100 km team time trial championship (in a record time of 2:00:07), having previously won the event three times with Manchester Wheelers' Club, in 1988, 1989 and 1991.

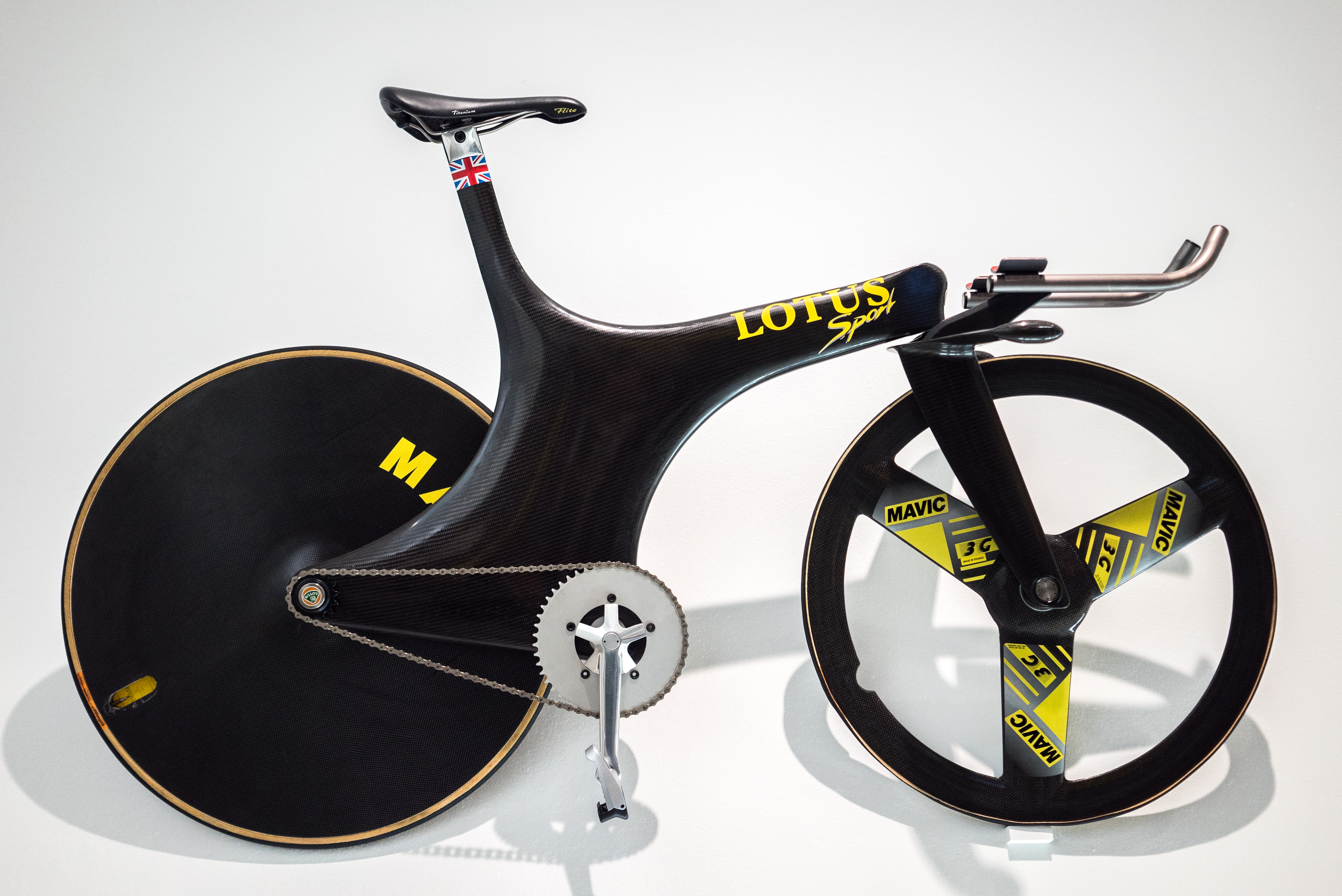
The Lotus 108 bicycle Boardman used to win the 4 km individual pursuit at the 1992 Summer Olympics

At the 1992 Summer Olympics in Barcelona, Boardman rode a Lotus 108 in the 4 km individual pursuit. Lotus Engineering's 'uni-axle' design incorporated several new features. Boardman caught Germany's Jens Lehmann, the 1991 World Champion, in the Olympic final on his way to winning the gold medal.

== Professional career ==
Having started his cycling career as a time trial specialist, Boardman turned professional with the GAN team, later renamed the Crédit Agricole team, of manager Roger Legeay. His first race as a professional was the 1993 Grand Prix Eddy Merckx, a 66 km time trial which he won. He further won several stages of the Midi Libre and Critérium du Dauphiné Libéré stage races, including the final road stage. In 1993 Boardman established the fastest time for a bicycle around the 37.73 mile Snaefell Mountain Course, the course used for the Isle of Man TT Races. Riding a specially modified bicycle, Boardman recorded a time of 1hr 23min 54secs. The time recorded would prove to be the longest standing cycling record on the Isle of Man, until it was beaten by Peter Kennaugh in 2015. Kennaugh, riding a standard racing bicycle, beat the record by six seconds.

Boardman competed with Graeme Obree for the hour record using radically modified time-trial bikes, beating each other's records in turn; in one eight-month period in 1994 the record fell four times. Boardman won the prologue of the 1994 Tour de France with what was then the fastest time ever recorded. In the process he caught Luc Leblanc, who had previously been dismissive about Boardman's 1993 hour record, claiming that it could probably be beaten by half the professional peloton. However, he subsequently lost the yellow jersey in a team time trial. He was hailed as the UK's future Tour de France winner, despite his own insistence that it was a long shot. After retirement he said he was not able to recover from the rigours of stage racing due to a low hormone profile. "I've always had it, it's probably been that way since I was born, but because of the type of racing that I did in the past, it was not a problem."

In the 1995 Tour de France, Boardman crashed in the prologue and withdrew due to his injuries. The 1996 Tour de France saw him return in the wet and rainy prologue where he was beaten by Alex Zülle and finished in second place. Boardman won bronze in the 52 km road time trial at the 1996 Summer Olympics in Atlanta. He did not defend his track individual pursuit title.

Boardman made a comeback at the 1997 Tour de France, winning the prologue of the Tour once more this time on a Hotta TT, although a crash forced him to quit the tour on stage 13.

In 1998 Tour de France, when the Tour began in Dublin, Ireland, Boardman won the prologue, but this time crashed out of the race on stage 2. In 1998 he was diagnosed with osteopenia due to low testosterone levels. Treatment to prevent a worsening of his condition would have required him to take testosterone, which is banned under anti-doping rules. The UCI refused to allow Boardman an exemption on medical grounds. Faced with either retiring to allow treatment for his osteoporosis, or continuing to cycle without taking testosterone, Boardman chose to continue in cycling untreated for a further two years, hoping to finish his career on a high note at the 2000 Summer Olympics.

In 1997 the Union Cycliste Internationale (UCI) had changed their regulations for the hour record, restricting competitors to roughly the same equipment that Eddy Merckx had used in the 1970s, banning time trial helmets, disc or tri-spoke wheels, aerodynamic bars and monocoque composite frames. Boardman made an attempt at the hour record using this new ruling in 2000 and rode 49.441 km, just 13 m further than Merckx's 28-year-old record.

Boardman's preparation for the road time trial at the 2000 Olympics was affected by missing the 2000 Tour de France due to sinus problems; he finished eleventh in the time trial.

Boardman retired after the Olympics, at the age of 32. In an interview Boardman said that the last two years of his professional career were the most difficult, especially because of his debilitating health condition and also marital issues. Boardman's osteoporosis was uncommon for someone as young as he was. He was criticised for not realising his potential, but in response he said that, "I never considered myself particularly gifted, but I managed to stretch and mould the ability that I have, and found a niche for myself."

== Work after retirement ==
Since retirement from professional cycling, Boardman has undertaken a range of roles including television punditry, advising the British cycling teams and working in walking and cycling advocacy roles.

Boardman was appointed a technical adviser to the British road and track cycling team in 2004, and was equipment and technical manager to the TeamGB cyclists at the 2008 Beijing Olympic Games.

Boardman has a brand of cycles and accessories under the name Boardman Bikes. He is also involved in producing competition cycles through Boardman Elite.

=== Walking and cycling advocacy ===
Boardman has worked in various walking and cycling advocacy roles. He first took up these roles after his young daughter asked to ride to the park with him, in the northern seaside town where they lived; Boardman refused, thinking it too dangerous. He said it felt very wrong that he, an ex-Olympic cyclist, did not feel he could keep his child safe on a one-minute 550m ride, so he decided to do something about it.

He is an advocate of policies to greatly increase utility cycling in the United Kingdom, citing the potential to reduce the 35,000 annual deaths from obesity-related diseases, and urging that in road traffic accidents there be a presumption of guilt on the driver of the larger vehicle. In July 2016, his mother Carol was killed by a motor vehicle while cycling; the driver was jailed for causing death by dangerous driving.

Boardman was appointed Greater Manchester's first Cycling and Walking Commissioner by Andy Burnham in July 2017. He developed a plan to create 1,800 miles of protected walking and cycling routes. In May 2021, he became Greater Manchester's first Transport Commissioner.

Boardman was appointed as Interim Commissioner for the government's new cycling and walking body, Active Travel England, in January 2022, and permanently as Commissioner from June 2022, leaving his role at Greater Manchester.

=== Television pundit and commentator ===
Boardman has worked as a contributor to cycling programmes on both BBC and ITV, including commentary at the Olympics Games and at the Tour de France. For the BBC, he has worked on five Summer Olympic Games since Beijing 2008 and four Commonwealth Games since Delhi 2010 as a cycling commentator.

== Personal life ==
Boardman lives with his wife and six children in his native Wirral. In 1992, he was awarded an MBE for services to cycling. In 2009 Boardman took part in the London marathon, finishing in 3hrs 19min 27sec. He was also inducted into the British Cycling Hall of Fame. In 2024, he was further awarded a CBE for services to active travel.

== Career achievements ==
=== Major results ===
Source:

=== Road ===
1988
1st National Hill Climb Championships
1989
1st National Hill Climb Championships
1990
1st National Hill Climb Championships
1st Prologue Olympia's Tour
3rd Team time trial, Commonwealth Games
1991
1st National Hill Climb Championships
1993
1st Chrono des Herbiers
1st Duo Normand (with Laurent Bezault)
1st Grand Prix Eddy Merckx
2nd Firenze–Pistoia
4th Grand Prix des Nations
1994
1st Time trial, UCI World Championships
Tour de France

1st Prologue
Held after Prologue–Stage 2
Held after Prologue

Critérium du Dauphiné Libéré

1st Prologue & Stages 3 (ITT) & 7

Vuelta a Murcia

1st Prologue & Stage 5 (ITT)

1st Stage 6 (ITT) Tour de Suisse
2nd Circuit de l'Aulne
3rd GP Karlsruhe (with Pascal Lance)
4th Overall Tour de l'Oise
6th Grand Prix des Nations
10th Grand Prix Eddy Merckx
1995
1st Stage 4 (ITT) Four Days of Dunkirk
2nd Overall Critérium du Dauphiné Libéré

1st Prologue

2nd Overall Tour de Picardie

1st Stage 3b (ITT)

6th Trophée des Grimpeurs
10th Overall Grand Prix du Midi Libre

1st Stage 6 (ITT)

1996
1st Overall Critérium International
1st Chrono des Herbiers
1st Grand Prix Eddy Merckx
1st Grand Prix des Nations
1st Duo Normand (with Paul Manning)
1st LuK Challenge Chrono (with Uwe Peschel)
1st Stage 3 (ITT) Four Days of Dunkirk
1st Stage 2a Route du Sud
2nd Time trial, UCI World Championships
3rd Time trial, Olympic Games
3rd Overall Paris–Nice

1st Stage 8b (ITT)

3rd Overall Tour de l'Oise
4th Overall Grand Prix du Midi Libre
5th Overall Critérium du Dauphiné Libéré

1st Prologue

7th Overall Tour Méditerranéen
1997
Tour de France

1st Prologue
Held after Prologue–Stage 2
Held after Prologue

Volta a Catalunya

1st Stages 1b (ITT) & 5 (ITT)

1st Prologue Critérium du Dauphiné Libéré
1st Stage 5b (ITT) Vuelta a la Comunitat Valenciana
2nd Overall Tour de Romandie

1st Prologue & Stage 6 (ITT)

2nd Grand Prix Eddy Merckx
3rd Time trial, UCI World Championships
3rd Grand Prix des Nations
5th Overall Tour of the Basque Country
10th Overall À travers Lausanne
1998
Tour de France

1st Prologue
Held after Prologue–Stage 1
Held after Prologue

Volta a Catalunya

1st Prologue & Stage 5 (ITT)

Critérium du Dauphiné Libéré

1st Prologue & Stage 4 (ITT)

1st Stage 5b Tour de l'Ain
2nd Overall Prutour

1st Prologue & Stage 1

4th Grand Prix Eddy Merckx
8th Chrono des Herbiers
1999
1st GP Karlsruhe (with Jens Voigt)
1st Duo Normand (with Jens Voigt)
1st LuK Challenge Chrono (with Jens Voigt)
1st Prologue Paris–Nice
1st Stage 3 (ITT) Critérium International
1st Stage 2b (ITT) Prutour
2nd Grand Prix des Nations
3rd Time trial, UCI World Championships
3rd Grand Prix Eddy Merckx (with Jens Voigt)
6th Chrono des Herbiers
8th Overall Circuit de la Sarthe
2000
2nd Grand Prix Eddy Merckx (with Jens Voigt)
4th Time trial, UCI World Championships
8th Overall Circuit de la Sarthe
8th Grand Prix des Nations

==== Grand Tour general classification results timeline ====
Grand Tour	1994	1995	1996	1997	1998	1999
Giro d'Italia	—	—	—	—	—	—
Tour de France	DNF	DNF	39	DNF	DNF	119
/ Vuelta a España	—	—	—	DNF	DNF	—

Legend
—	Did not compete
DNF	Did not finish

=== Track ===
1986
3rd Team pursuit, Commonwealth Games
1989
1st Individual pursuit, National Amateur Championships
1990
3rd Team pursuit, Commonwealth Games
1991
1st Individual pursuit, National Amateur Championships
1992
1st Individual pursuit, Olympic Games
1st Individual pursuit, National Amateur Championships
1993
Best human effort: 52.270 km
3rd Individual pursuit, UCI World Championships
1994
1st Individual pursuit, UCI World Championships
1996
Best human effort: 56.375 km
1st Individual pursuit, UCI World Championships
2000
Hour record: 49.441 km

=== World records ===
Discipline	Record	Date	Event	Velodrome	Track	Ref
4 km individual pursuit	4:27.357	27 July 1992	Olympic Games	D'Horta (Barcelona)	Open air	
4 km individual pursuit	4:24.496	27 July 1992	Olympic Games	D'Horta (Barcelona)	Open air	
Hour record	52.270 km	23 July 1993	—	Bordeaux	Indoor	
4 km individual pursuit	4:13.353	28 August 1996	World Championships	Manchester	Indoor	
4 km individual pursuit	4:11.114	29 August 1996	World Championships	Manchester	Indoor	
Hour record	56.375 km	6 September 1996	—	Manchester	Indoor	
Hour record	49.441 km	27 October 2000	—	Manchester	Indoor	

=== Awards and honours ===
- Bidlake Memorial Prize: 1992
- Sports Journalists' Association Pat Besford Award: 1992
- Member of the Order of the British Empire: 1993
- British Cycling Hall of Fame: 2010

== See also ==
- List of British cyclists
- List of British cyclists who have led the Tour de France general classification
- List of Olympic medalists in cycling (men)
- World record progression track cycling – Men's individual pursuit
- Yellow jersey statistics

Preceded by Eddy Merckx	UCI hour record (49.441 km); 27 October 2000 – 19 July 2005	Succeeded by Ondřej Sosenka
