= List of cyclists in the 1905 Tour de France =

Before the start of the 1905 Tour de France, 78 riders had signed up for the race. Eighteen of those did not start the race, so the Tour began with 60 riders, including former winner Henri Cornet and future winners René Pottier and Lucien Petit-Breton. The riders were not grouped in teams, but most of them rode with an individual sponsor. Two of the cyclists—Catteau and Lootens—were Belgian, all other cyclists were French. Leading up to the start of the Tour, Wattelier, Trousselier, Pottier and Augereau were all considered the most likely contenders to win the event.

== By starting number ==
Legend
No.	Starting number worn by the rider during the Tour
Pos.	Position in the general classification
DNF	Denotes a rider who did not finish

No.	Name	Nationality	Pos.	Ref
1	J. Mechin	France	DNF	
2	Henri Pépin	France	DNF	
3	Camille Fily	France	14	
4	Léon Riche	France	DNF	
5	Léon Leygoutte	France	13	
6	Pierre Desvages	France	DNF	
7	Philippe Pautrat	France	8	
9	Henri Lignon	France	16	
10	Félix Bernard	France	DNF	
11	Jean Fischer	France	DNF	
12	René Pottier	France	DNF	
13	Hippolyte Aucouturier	France	2	
14	Louis Trousselier	France	1	
15	Jules Chosson	France	DNF	
18	Joseph Delporte	France	DNF	
19	Charles Habert	France	DNF	
20	Georges Pasquier	France	DNF	
21	Julien Gabory	France	9	
22	Augustin Ringeval	France	6	
23	Maurice Carrere	France	18	
24	Gustave Guillarme	France	19	
25	Henri Richard	France	DNF	
27	Charles Prévost	France	DNF	
28	Francis Gouspy	France	DNF	
29	Jean Dargassies	France	DNF	
30	Noël Prévost	France	DNF	
31	Jean-Baptiste Dortignacq	France	3	
32	Fernand Lallement	France	23	
34	Pinchau	France	21	
35	Eugène Ventresque	France	22	
36	Marcel Morvan	France	DNF	
37	Henri Cornet	France	DNF	
38	Martin Soulie	France	12	
39	Antoine Perrichon	France	DNF	
40	Clovis Lacroix	France	24	
41	Henri Gauban	France	DNF	
42	Maurice Chedebois	France	DNF	
43	Auguste Daumain	France	DNF	
44	Georges Sérès	France	DNF	
45	Louis Lavalette	France	DNF	
46	Henri Marchand	France	DNF	
47	Georges Bamonde	France	DNF	
49	Auguste Laprée	France	DNF	
50	Émile Georget	France	4	
51	Germain Fourchotte	France	DNF	
52	Paul Chauvet	France	7	
53	Henri Vigne	France	DNF	
54	Julien Maitron	France	10	
55	Antoine Wattelier	France	15	
57	Auguste Théo	France	DNF	
59	Julien Lootens	Belgium	20	
62	Édouard Grandsire	France	DNF	
64	Édouard Wattelier	France	DNF	
67	Élie Mogne	France	DNF	
68	Aloïs Catteau	Belgium	11	
72	Léon Habets	France	DNF	
73	Paul Trippier	France	DNF	
75	Jean Ruffin	France	DNF	
76	Maurice Decaup	France	17	
77	Lucien Mazan	France	5	
