= 1905 Tour de France, Stage 7 to Stage 11 =

Cycling race stages

Route of the 1905 Tour de France

The 1905 Tour de France was the 3rd edition of Tour de France, one of cycling's Grand Tours. The Tour began in Paris on 9 July and Stage 7 occurred on 22 July with a flat stage from Toulouse. The race finished in Paris on 29 July.

== Stage 7 ==
22 July 1905 — Toulouse to Bordeaux, 268 km (166.5 mi)

Stage 7 result

Rank	Rider	Time
1	Louis Trousselier (FRA)	10h 12' 40"
2	Philippe Pautrat (FRA)	+ 1"
3	Maurice Decaup (FRA)	+ 2"
4	Hippolyte Aucouturier (FRA)	+ 3"
5	Paul Chauvet (FRA)	+ 4"
6	Jean-Baptiste Dortignacq (FRA)	+ 5"
7	Léon Leygoutte (FRA)	+ 6"
8	Émile Georget (FRA)	+ 7"
9	Julien Gabory (FRA)	+ 8"
10	Camille Fily (FRA)	+ 9"

General classification after stage 7

Rank	Rider	Points
1	Louis Trousselier (FRA)	21
2	Hippolyte Aucouturier (FRA)	43
3	Jean-Baptiste Dortignacq (FRA)	57
4		
5		
6		
7		
8		
9		
10		

== Stage 8 ==
24 July 1905 — Bordeaux to La Rochelle, 257 km (159.7 mi)

Stage 8 result

Rank	Rider	Time
1	Hippolyte Aucouturier (FRA)	8h 25' 45"
2	Jean-Baptiste Dortignacq (FRA)	s.t.
3	Louis Trousselier (FRA)	+ 2"
4	Augustin Ringeval (FRA)	+ 3"
5	Émile Georget (FRA)	+ 4"
6	Paul Chauvet (FRA)	+ 16' 55"
7	Jean Fischer (FRA)	+ 16' 56"
8	Camille Fily (FRA)	+ 16' 58"
9	Lucien Mazan (FRA)	+ 23' 17"
10	Julien Maitron (FRA)	+ 23' 20"

General classification after stage 8

Rank	Rider	Points
1	Louis Trousselier (FRA)	24
2	Hippolyte Aucouturier (FRA)	44
3	Jean-Baptiste Dortignacq (FRA)	59
4		
5		
6		
7		
8		
9		
10		

== Stage 9 ==
26 July 1905 — La Rochelle to Rennes, 263 km (163 mi)

Stage 9 result

Rank	Rider	Time
1	Louis Trousselier (FRA)	10h 25' 45"
2	Maurice Decaup (FRA)	+ 1"
3	Jean-Baptiste Dortignacq (FRA)	+ 2"
4	Émile Georget (FRA)	+ 3"
5	Lucien Mazan (FRA)	+ 4"
6	Philippe Pautrat (FRA)	+ 5"
7	Hippolyte Aucouturier (FRA)	+ 6"
8	Augustin Ringeval (FRA)	+ 7"
9	Gustave Guillarme (FRA)	+ 8"
10	Henri Lignon (FRA)	+ 9"

General classification after stage 9

Rank	Rider	Points
1	Louis Trousselier (FRA)	25
2	Hippolyte Aucouturier (FRA)	51
3	Jean-Baptiste Dortignacq (FRA)	62
4		
5		
6		
7		
8		
9		
10		

== Stage 10 ==
28 July 1905 — Rennes to Caen, 167 km (104 mi)

Stage 10 result

Rank	Rider	Time
1	Jean-Baptiste Dortignacq (FRA)	6h 33' 01"
2	Maurice Decaup (FRA)	+ 1"
3	Lucien Mazan (FRA)	+ 2"
4	Louis Trousselier (FRA)	+ 3"
5	Philippe Pautrat (FRA)	+ 4"
6	Julien Maitron (FRA)	+ 5"
7	Hippolyte Aucouturier (FRA)	+ 6"
8	Émile Georget (FRA)	+ 7"
9	Augustin Ringeval (FRA)	+ 8"
10	Aloïs Catteau (BEL)	+ 9"

General classification after stage 10

Rank	Rider	Points
1	Louis Trousselier (FRA)	29
2	Hippolyte Aucouturier (FRA)	58
3	Jean-Baptiste Dortignacq (FRA)	63
4		
5		
6		
7		
8		
9		
10		

== Stage 11 ==
29 July 1905 — Caen to Paris, 253 km (157 mi)

Stage 11 result

Rank	Rider	Time
1	Jean-Baptiste Dortignacq (FRA)	7h 30' 00"
2	Lucien Mazan (FRA)	+ 1"
3	Hippolyte Aucouturier (FRA)	+ 2' 30"
4	Louis Trousselier (FRA)	+ 17' 01"
5	Augustin Ringeval (FRA)	+ 23' 00"
6	Émile Georget (FRA)	+ 25' 15"
7	Paul Chauvet (FRA)	+ 1h 18' 10"
8	Henri Lignon (FRA)	s.t.
9	Antoine Wattelier (FRA)	+ 1h 18' 15"
10	Camille Fily (FRA)	+ 1h 40' 00"

General classification after stage 11

Rank	Rider	Points
1	Louis Trousselier (FRA)	35
2	Hippolyte Aucouturier (FRA)	61
3	Jean-Baptiste Dortignacq (FRA)	64
4	Émile Georget (FRA)	123
5	Lucien Mazan (FRA)	155
6	Augustin Ringeval (FRA)	202
7	Paul Chauvet (FRA)	231
8	Philippe Pautrat (FRA)	248
9	Julien Gabory (FRA)	255
10	Julien Maitron (FRA)	304
