= 1905 Tour de France, Stage 1 to Stage 6 =

Cycling race stages

Route of the 1905 Tour de France

The 1905 Tour de France was the 3rd edition of Tour de France, one of cycling's Grand Tours. The Tour began in Paris on 9 July and Stage 6 occurred on 20 July with a flat stage to Toulouse. The race finished in Paris on 29 July.

== Stage 1 ==
9 July 1905 — Paris to Nancy, 340 km (211.3 mi)

Stage 1 result and general classification after stage 1

Rank	Rider	Time
1	Louis Trousselier (FRA)	11h 25' 00"
2	Jean-Baptiste Dortignacq (FRA)	+ 3' 00"
3	René Pottier (FRA)	+ 4' 00"
4	Hippolyte Aucouturier (FRA)	+ 26' 00"
5	Henri Cornet (FRA)	s.t.
6	Augustin Ringeval (FRA)	+ 1h 40' 00"
7	Émile Georget (FRA)	+ 2h 40' 00"
8	Germain Fourchotte (FRA)	s.t.
9	Julien Gabory (FRA)	+ 2h 48' 00"
10	Henri Lignon (FRA)	+ 3h 39' 00"

== Stage 2 ==
11 July 1905 — Nancy to Besançon, 299 km (185.8 mi)

Stage 2 result

Rank	Rider	Time
1	Hippolyte Aucouturier (FRA)	10h 11' 00"
2	René Pottier (FRA)	+ 10' 00"
3	Louis Trousselier (FRA)	+ 26' 00"
4	Julien Maitron (FRA)	+ 31' 00"
5	Henri Cornet (FRA)	+ 45' 30"
6	Germain Fourchotte (FRA)	+ 51' 30"
7	Lucien Mazan (FRA)	+ 1h 10' 00"
8	Julien Gabory (FRA)	s.t.
9	Émile Georget (FRA)	s.t.
10	Jean-Baptiste Dortignacq (FRA)	+ 1h 29' 00"

General classification after stage 2

Rank	Rider	Points
1	René Pottier (FRA)	7
2	Hippolyte Aucouturier (FRA)	9
3	Louis Trousselier (FRA)	9
4		
5		
6		
7		
8		
9		
10		

== Stage 3 ==
14 July 1905 — Besançon to Grenoble, 327 km (203 mi)

Stage 3 result

Rank	Rider	Time
1	Louis Trousselier (FRA)	11h 14' 00"
2	Lucien Mazan (FRA)	+ 45"
3	Augustin Ringeval (FRA)	+ 50"
4	Henri Cornet (FRA)	+ 5' 00"
5	Hippolyte Aucouturier (FRA)	+ 10' 15"
6	Philippe Pautrat (FRA)	+ 19' 50"
7	Paul Chauvet (FRA)	+ 19' 51"
8	Jean-Baptiste Dortignacq (FRA)	+ 19' 52"
9	Julien Maitron (FRA)	+ 19' 53"
10	Julien Gabory (FRA)	+ 19' 54"

General classification after stage 3

Rank	Rider	Points
1	Louis Trousselier (FRA)	10
2	Hippolyte Aucouturier (FRA)	15
3	Henri Cornet (FRA)	25
4		
5		
6		
7		
8		
9		
10		

== Stage 4 ==
16 July 1905 — Grenoble to Toulon, 348 km (216 mi)

Stage 4 result

Rank	Rider	Time
1	Hippolyte Aucouturier (FRA)	13h 19' 45"
2	Louis Trousselier (FRA)	+ 24' 10"
3	Jean-Baptiste Dortignacq (FRA)	+ 24' 11"
4	Julien Maitron (FRA)	+ 59' 01"
5	Lucien Mazan (FRA)	+ 1h 08' 24"
6	Émile Georget (FRA)	+ 1h 08' 25"
7	Philippe Pautrat (FRA)	+ 1h 08' 26"
8	Paul Chauvet (FRA)	+ 1h 51' 15"
9	Germain Fourchotte (FRA)	+ 1h 51' 16"
10	Augustin Ringeval (FRA)	+ 2h 26' 15"

General classification after stage 4

Rank	Rider	Points
1	Louis Trousselier (FRA)	16
2	Hippolyte Aucouturier (FRA)	16
3	Jean-Baptiste Dortignacq (FRA)	44
4		
5		
6		
7		
8		
9		
10		

== Stage 5 ==
18 July 1905 — Toulon to Nîmes, 192 km (119 mi)

Stage 5 result

Rank	Rider	Time
1	Louis Trousselier (FRA)	7h 24' 00"
2	Maurice Decaup (FRA)	s.t.
3	Émile Georget (FRA)	+ 20"
4	Lucien Mazan (FRA)	+ 30"
5	Germain Fourchotte (FRA)	+ 50"
6	Jean-Baptiste Dortignacq (FRA)	+ 1' 00"
7	Augustin Ringeval (FRA)	+ 32' 30"
8	Philippe Pautrat (FRA)	+ 32' 40"
9	Julien Gabory (FRA)	+ 33' 00"
10	Léon Leygoutte (FRA)	s.t.

General classification after stage 5

Rank	Rider	Points
1	Louis Trousselier (FRA)	17
2	Hippolyte Aucouturier (FRA)	34
3	Jean-Baptiste Dortignacq (FRA)	50
4		
5		
6		
7		
8		
9		
10		

== Stage 6 ==
20 July 1905 — Nîmes to Toulouse, 307 km (191 mi)

Stage 6 result

Rank	Rider	Time
1	Jean-Baptiste Dortignacq (FRA)	12h 07' 45"
2	Lucien Mazan (FRA)	s.t.
3	Louis Trousselier (FRA)	+ 2"
4	Émile Georget (FRA)	+ 3"
5	Hippolyte Aucouturier (FRA)	+ 4"
6	Maurice Decaup (FRA)	+ 5"
7	Germain Fourchotte (FRA)	+ 6"
8	Aloïs Catteau (BEL)	+ 7"
9	Jean Fischer (FRA)	+ 8"
10	Julien Gabory (FRA)	+ 9"

General classification after stage 6

Rank	Rider	Points
1	Louis Trousselier (FRA)	20
2	Hippolyte Aucouturier (FRA)	39
3	Jean-Baptiste Dortignacq (FRA)	51
4		
5		
6		
7		
8		
9		
10		
