= Domestique =

Type of road racing cyclist

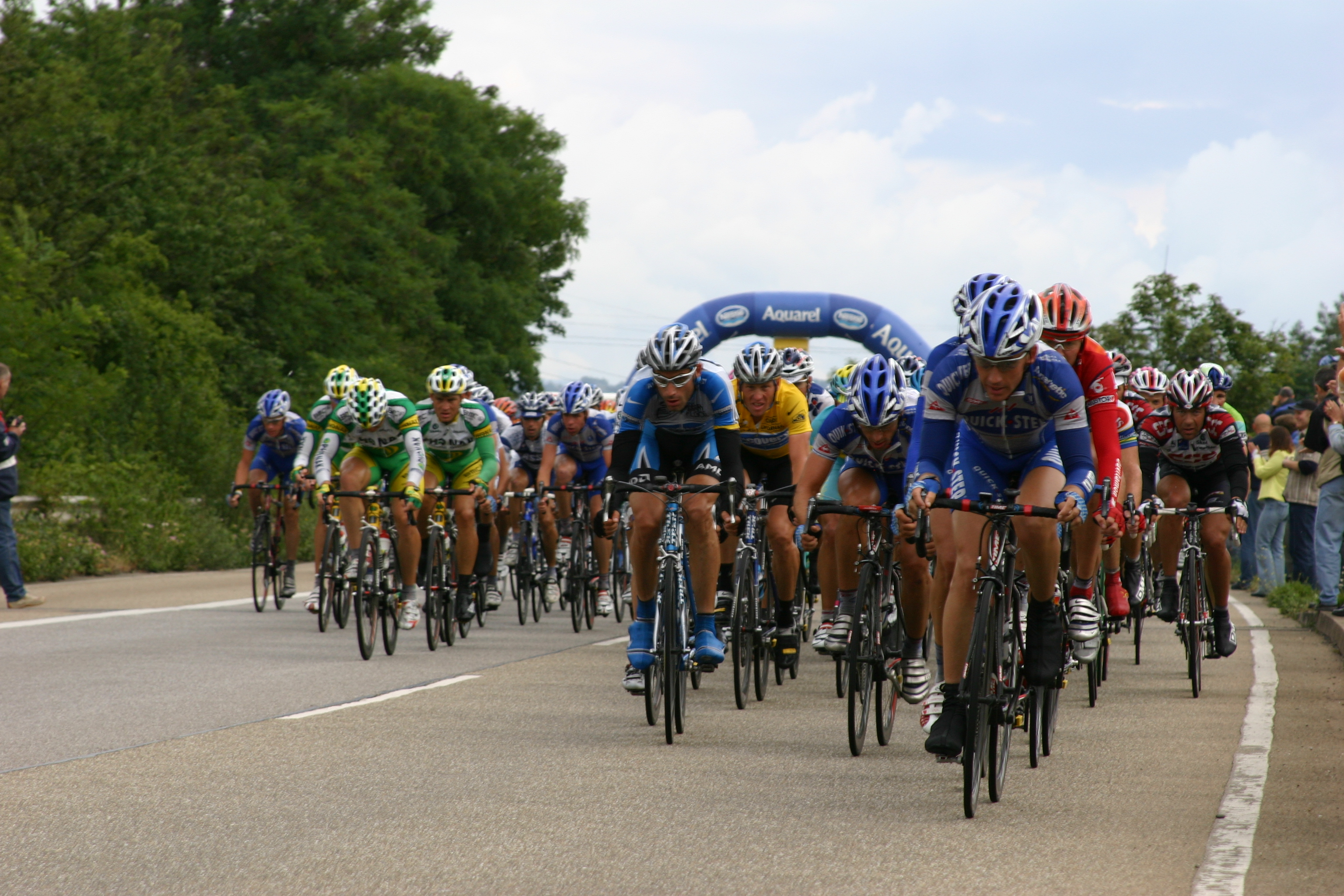
Domestiques from several teams form lines at the front of the peloton to keep their leaders near the front of the race. Note George Hincapie working for his team leader Lance Armstrong, visible in the yellow jersey of the Tour de France.

In road bicycle racing, a domestique is a rider who works for the benefit of their team and leader, rather than trying to win the race. In French, domestique translates as "servant". (Note: However, in French, the term used is équipier. In Italy and Spain, the term used is gregario (meaning "soldier of the Roman legions" or "one of the group", see etymology). In Belgium and the Netherlands the term knecht (meaning "servant" or "helper" in Dutch) is used.) The use of the term dates back to 1911, although such riders had existed before then.

== Theoretical basis ==
Much of a cyclist's effort is to push aside the air in front of them. Riding in the slipstream of another rider is easier than taking the lead. The difference increases with speed. Racers have known this from the start and have ridden accordingly, often sharing the lead between them. From there it is a small step to employing a rider to create a slipstream while their leader rides behind them.

More complicated tactics become possible as the number of domestiques available increases (see below). Where the domestique finishes a race is less important than the help he gives. During their role as domestiques, riders do not share the fame of their respective leaders, such as Eddy Merckx, Bernard Hinault, or Miguel Induráin.

Many domestiques have ultimately gone on to achieve fame of their own, however. Lucien Aimar, who supported Jacques Anquetil, won the 1966 Tour de France. Greg LeMond won the 1986 Tour de France after being Bernard Hinault's domestique in the 1985 Tour de France, as did Jan Ullrich in 1997 after riding for Bjarne Riis in 1996, Chris Froome in 2013 after riding for Bradley Wiggins in 2012, and Jonas Vingegaard, who scored second place at the Tour in 2021 before ultimately going on to win in 2022 and 2023 after being domestique for Primož Roglič. The writer Roger St Pierre said:

It is team tactics which so often win or lose races – and the lieutenants and the dog soldiers who expend their energy blocking chasing moves when they have riders up the road in a position to win. It is they who ride out into the wind so their aces can get an easier ride tucked inside their wheel [close to the rider in front and in his shelter]. Rare indeed is the major victory that cannot be credited in large part to the groundwork laid by the domestiques.

— Roger St Pierre

== First domestiques ==
The first riders known to have been employed to help a leader were Jean Dargassies and Henri Gauban. They rode in the 1907 Tour de France for Henri Pépin, who promised them the equivalent of first prize if they would pace him from restaurant to restaurant. The three never hurried. They took 12 hours and 20 minutes longer than Émile Georget on the stage from Roubaix to Metz – they were far from last – and the judges were powerless because the race was decided not on time but points. It mattered less what speed riders competed than the order in which they crossed the line. In an era when riders could be separated by hours, there was no point in hurrying after a rival who could not be caught and passed. The judges had to wait for everyone.

The rules of the Tour in its first decades forbade team riding, but Pépin did little to affect the result. He dropped out on stage five.

== Terminology origin ==
The word was first used in cycling as an insult for Maurice Brocco, known as Coco, in 1911. Brocco started six Tours de France between 1908 and 1914, finished none of them, although a stage he won in 1911 caused the coining of domestique. Brocco's chances in 1911 ended when he lost time on the day to Chamonix. Unable to win, the next day he offered his services to other riders, for which he had a reputation. François Faber was in danger of being eliminated for taking too long and the two came to a deal. Brocco waited for Faber and paced him to the finish. Henri Desgrange, the organiser and chief judge, wanted to disqualify him for breaking the rules. But he had no proof and feared Brocco would appeal to the national cycling body, the Union Vélocipédique Française. He limited himself to scorn in his newspaper, L'Auto, writing: "He is unworthy. He is no more than a domestique."

Next morning Brocco greeted Desgrange with: "Today, monsieur, we are going to settle our accounts." He won the day by 34 minutes. Desgrange followed him and the yellow jersey, Gustave Garrigou, as they climbed the Tourmalet. "So, am I forbidden to ride with him?" Brocco shouted. On the following mountain, the Aubisque, he dropped Garrigou, passed Paul Duboc, who had been poisoned and was in agony beside the road, and took the lead with Émile Georget. Desgrange was still watching. "Alors, quoi", Brocco shouted, "do I have the right to stay with him?" And then he rode off alone and won. He had made two points to Desgrange. The first was that he was a talented rider and not a servant. The second was that he had so much talent that his poor riding with Faber could only have been through a commercial arrangement. Desgrange replied that any rider with such flair had clearly been selling the race. "He deserves his punishment", Desgrange wrote, "immediate disqualification."

Domestiques had long been accepted in other races. Desgrange believed the Tour should be a race of individuals and fought repeatedly with the sponsors, bicycle factories, who saw it otherwise. Desgrange got rid of the factories' influence only by reorganising the Tour for national teams in 1930, with the effect that he thereby acknowledged teamwork and therefore domestiques.

== Devoted domestiques ==
Vin Denson rode for Rik Van Looy.
"You did whatever he wanted, including the fetching of beers, which he had a great fondness for in mid-race.
Domestiques were reduced to chasing long miles to bring the great man a bottle of Stella".

— Vin Denson, ProCycling

The dominant climber of the 1950s, Charly Gaul, was followed for as long as he could last by Luxembourger Marcel Ernzer. The two men were of similar size and rode bikes of exactly the same dimensions, even though that made Ernzer a little low in the saddle. He was always there to give his bike to Gaul when it was needed.

Andrea Carrea was a domestique for Fausto Coppi. "He was a gregario par excellence", said the journalist Jean-Luc Gatellier, "the incarnation of personal disinterest ... showing to perfection the notion of personal sacrifice. He refused the slightest bit of personal glory." Carrea was riding the Tour de France of 1952 and joined an attack to Lausanne to protect his leader's interests.

Carrea said: "Without knowing it, I had slid into the important break of the day and at Lausanne, to my great surprise, I heard I had inherited a jersey destined for champions. For me, it was a terrible situation."

Carrea had no idea he had become race leader. When officials told him, he burst into tears. He had ousted Coppi and he dreaded the consequences. He wept as he received his jersey, looking constantly down the road for the main field that included his leader.

Jean-Paul Ollivier said: Carrea thought the sky had fallen in. How would Fausto take it? When the champion arrived a few minutes later, Carrea went towards him in tears to offer his excuses. "You must understand that I did not want this jersey, Fausto. I have no right to it. A poor man like me, the yellow jersey?"

Coppi said: "I wondered how Carrea, so shy and so emotional, was going to take it. When I went to congratulate him on the track at Lausanne, he didn't know what face he ought to adopt".

José Luis Arrieta was a domestique for Miguel Induráin. L'Équipe said: "He no longer counts the hours, the years, spent with his nose in the wind trying to protect his leader for as long as possible". Arrieta said:

When you have the chance to start your career in so big a team and at the side of a champion as great as Indurain, you grow in the service of sacrifice. I don't complain. To the contrary, I had the chance to live some wonderful moments. When Indurain won, or another rider for whom we had decided to work, it was a victory for all the team men as well".

== Types of support ==
=== Basic support ===
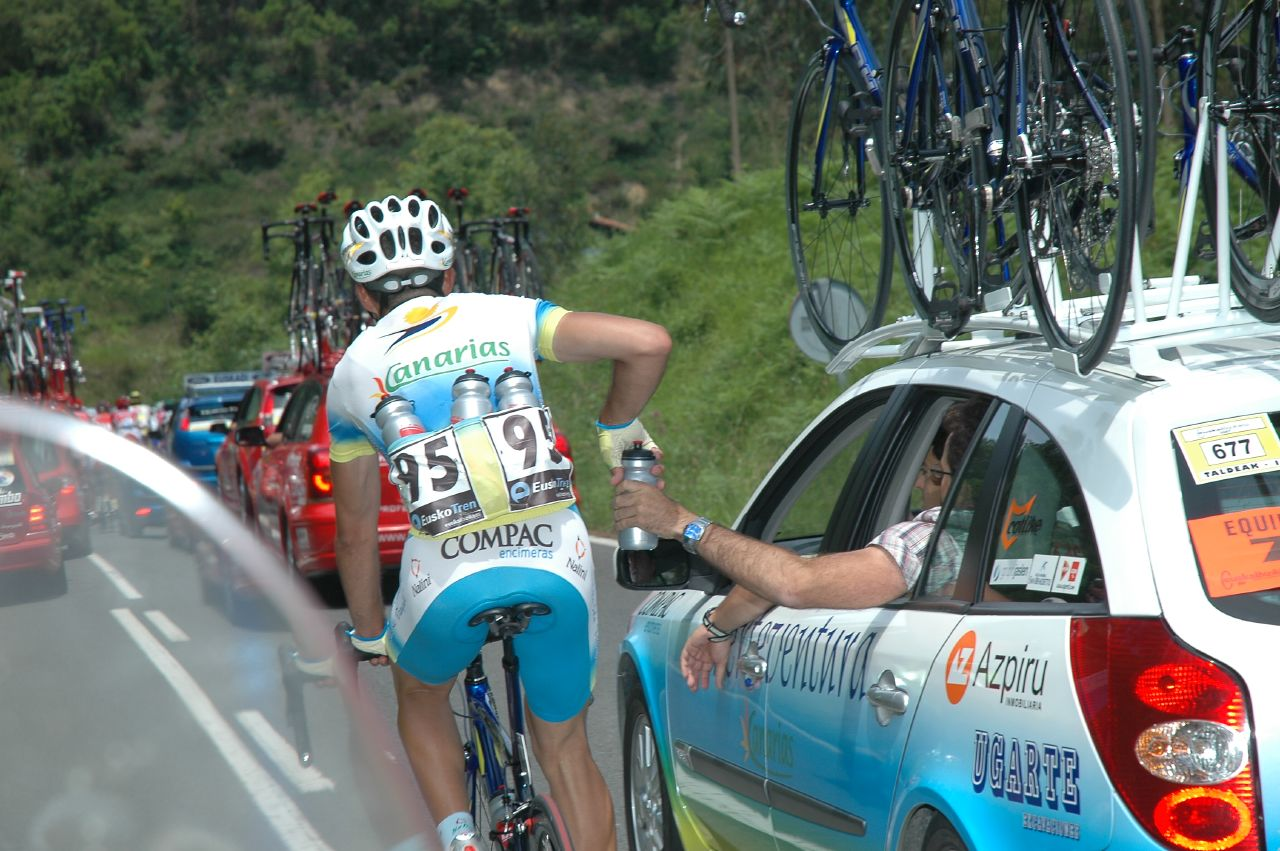
A domestique retrieving water bottles for his teammates

Domestiques bring water and food from team cars and shield teammates from opponents. They help teammates with mechanical disasters – should the leader puncture a tire, the domestique will cycle in front to create a slipstream allowing him to reclaim their position. A domestique may also sacrifice his bicycle or wheel.

=== Tactical support ===
Domestiques race in the interest of the team, or against opposing teams. By putting themselves in a breakaway they force other teams to chase. In turn, they chase a breakaway that threatens their team.

Domestiques lead out sprinters by letting them 'draft' behind to conserve energy until the last few hundred meters. The lead-out train sometimes starts 10–15 km to the finish with up to eight domestiques setting a pace to discourage others from breaking away. One by one, worn-out teammates drop off. The last to lead a sprinter is often a good sprinter himself. The sprinter will launch into a dash to the line with one or two hundred meters to go.

In mountainous races, domestiques help their leaders by setting a pace or thwarting attacks from others.

== Super-domestique ==
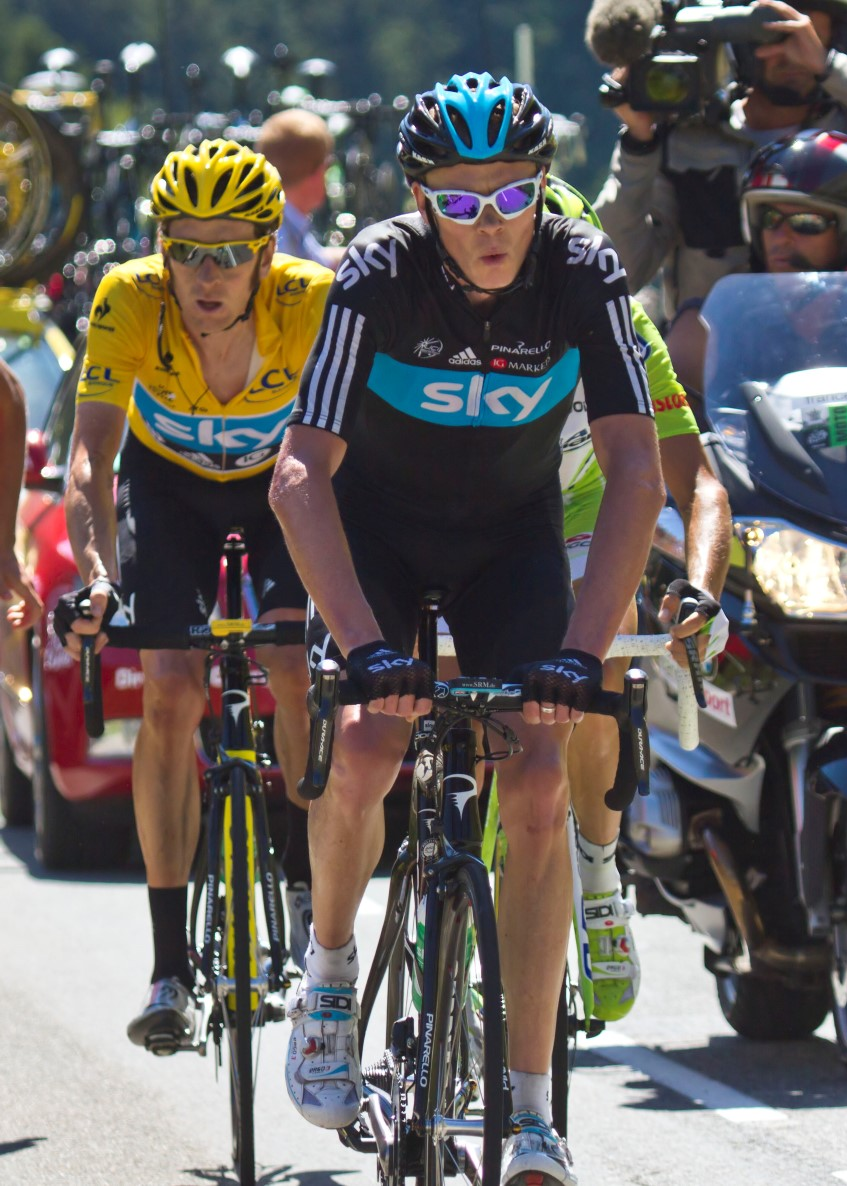
Chris Froome assisting Bradley Wiggins (yellow jersey) in the 2012 Tour de France. Froome went on to win the 2013 Tour de France.

There is a hierarchy among domestiques; the more accomplished, often called lieutenants or super-domestiques, are called upon during critical times. The lieutenant stays with the leader as long as possible during demanding periods. For example, Lance Armstrong used teammates Roberto Heras and José Azevedo as climbing domestiques to set pace during mountain stages of the Tour de France before making a decisive attack. Experienced super-domestiques often also have the role of captain, passing on tactical instructions to other riders and making tactical decisions when there is little or no contact with the coaching staff. Examples of traditional super-domestiques are Andreas Klöden with Astana Pro Team and George Hincapie who was a key lieutenant of U.S. Postal Team. Hincapie was also a domestique for Alberto Contador in 2007 and for Cadel Evans in 2011, when both went on to win the Tour.

Recent developments in the compositions of the rosters of leading teams have led to an increasing number of high-status riders fulfilling super-domestique duties, especially during the Grand Tours. This approach was largely originated by Team Sky, beginning with their success at the 2012 Tour de France, where Chris Froome finished second on the overall podium behind his teammate and compatriot Bradley Wiggins. This finish came after some tension between the two lead riders, in particular during Stage 17 of the race, where Froome was forced to wait for Wiggins – his defined team leader – three times on the climb to the summit finish at Peyragudes, allowing Alejandro Valverde to win the stage, while both Wiggins and Froome cemented their overall general classifications standings. Following this, a number of teams have adopted fluid, or shared team leadership at the Tour de France and the other Grand Tours. The 2017, 2018, and 2019 editions of the Tour de France all saw Sky – in 2019, changing sponsorship to become known as Team INEOS – successfully capture the yellow jersey, while a second rider from the team finished elsewhere within the top four: 2017 saw Froome win, with Mikel Landa coming fourth; in 2018, Geraint Thomas won his first Tour de France, while Froome finished third; and in 2019, Egan Bernal, who had himself served as a super-domestique to Froome and Thomas the previous year, subsequently finished first himself, with Thomas finishing second.

This top-heavy strategy has also been a feature of other teams in contention, with mixed results. The Movistar Team for the 2018 and 2019 Tours saw the deployment of the so-called 'Trident' of Mikel Landa, who had moved from Sky for the 2018 season, alongside long-term Movistar leaders and general classification contenders Nairo Quintana and Alejandro Valverde. This tactic was largely unsuccessful for Movistar, who experienced difficulties in coordinating their three leaders, none of whom appeared willing to sacrifice their own ambitions to serve as super-domestiques for one of the other two.

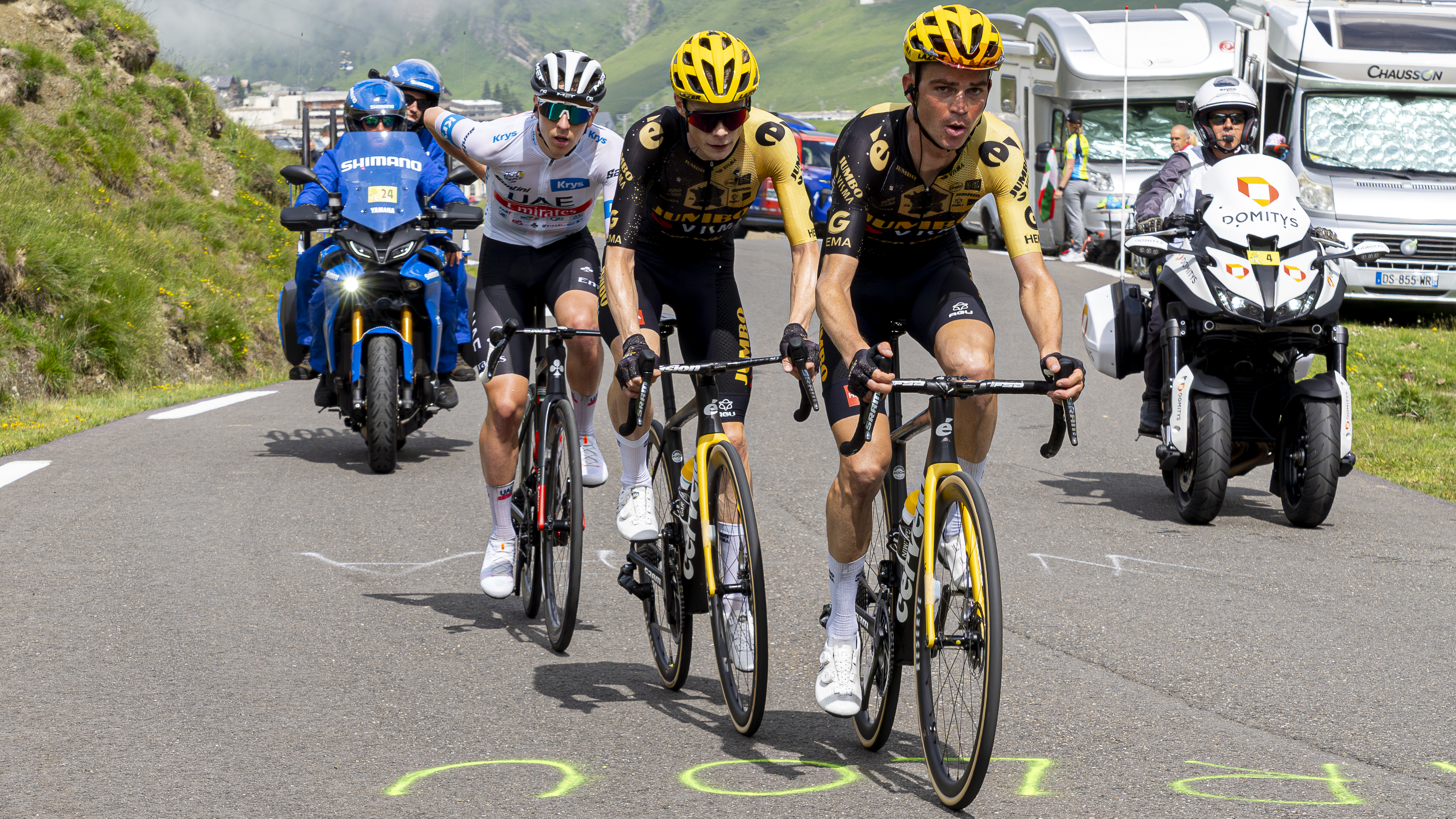
Sepp Kuss riding in support of Jonas Vingegaard at the 2023 Tour de France

Comparatively, a more successful and more hierarchical example of the super-domestique system featured at the 2020 Tour de France through Team Jumbo–Visma having entered the Tour with shared leadership between Tom Dumoulin and Primož Roglič – both of whom were previous Grand Tour winners, alongside high finishes at the Tour de France itself – Dumoulin recognised that he would be unable to maintain his own general classification campaign, and voluntarily assumed a super-domestique role to Roglič. This allowed Jumbo-Visma to operate with similar tactics to those used by Sky/INEOS in previous years, by setting a higher pace throughout difficult climbs, buoyed by the fact that Dumoulin and other Jumbo-Visma support riders such as Sepp Kuss would remain present in breakaways and leaders' groups to protect Roglič, while the weaker support riders surrounding other contenders would be whittled away. However, their defensive tactics had the unforeseen consequence of Jumbo-Visma helping eventual winner and rival Tadej Pogačar of UAE Team Emirates.

Nonetheless, the traditional domestique role remains an important one, and a 2020 poll of riders in the professional peloton by cyclingnews.com named Tim Declercq as the best domestique in the world, followed by Luke Rowe, Michael Mørkøv, Andrey Amador, Imanol Erviti, Michael Schär and Iljo Keisse.

== Individual glory ==
Domestiques sometimes get a chance to win stages in stage racing. Typically this would be late in a stage race. Domestiques whose standings do not threaten the leaders will often not be chased if they break away. Domestiques can progress to more senior roles if they show ability. For example, at the 2012 Tour de France Tejay van Garderen of BMC Racing Team began the tour as a domestique for 2011 winner Cadel Evans but later became team leader due to Evans struggling and eventually won the young rider classification. Chris Froome of Team Sky also won a stage while riding in support of winner Bradley Wiggins, and became team leader the following year, where he eventually won the general classification.

Assigned team roles vary substantially from race to race based on a variety of factors, including the course, the team members riding the race, their current physical condition, or even commercial factors. For instance, Stuart O'Grady, a veteran professional rider riding for Leopard-Trek, served as a domestique supporting Carlos Sastre in the 2008 Tour de France. By contrast, in the 2008 Herald Sun Tour, a much less-prominent race in which Sastre (and other high-profile members of the team) did not ride, the Australian O'Grady acted as team leader and was assisted by his teammates to win two stages and the general classification.

== Evolution of the domestique ==
The UCI points system changed the relationship between domestiques and leaders. Previously, domestiques were not concerned with their finishing order. However, riders now get points for their finish position. This presses domestiques to also consider their own performance in addition to their leader's.

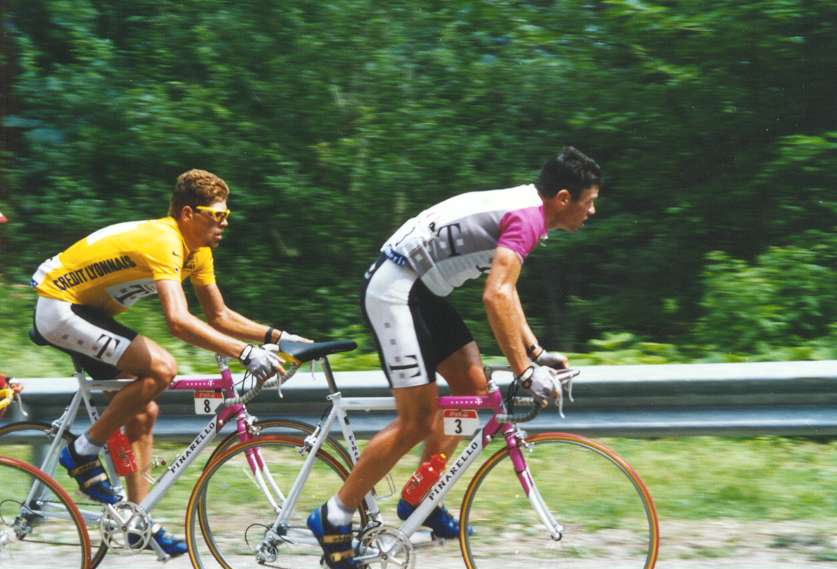
Udo Bölts (right) riding as a Domestique for Jan Ullrich (the eventual winner) during the 1997 Tour de France

The 1990s saw the introduction of radio communication, allowing managers to assign tasks to domestiques wherever they are on the road. The influence of radios on race tactics is a topic of discussion amongst the cycling community, with some arguing that the introduction of radios in the 1990s has devalued the tactical knowledge of individual riders and has led to less exciting racing. In September 2009, the Union Cycliste Internationale (UCI), the governing body of pro cycling, voted to phase in a ban on the use of team radios in men's elite road racing. Finally radio found its undisputed place in peloton for good and, as some races with imposed radio ban proved, the ban changed nothing in racing tactics.

== In track cycling ==
In track cycling's team pursuit event, a team of four riders must complete 4 km, with the third rider being used to stop the clock. Therefore, one rider often sprints towards the finish line to tow the teammates.

== See also ==
- Outline of cycling
