= Henri Pépin =

French cyclist

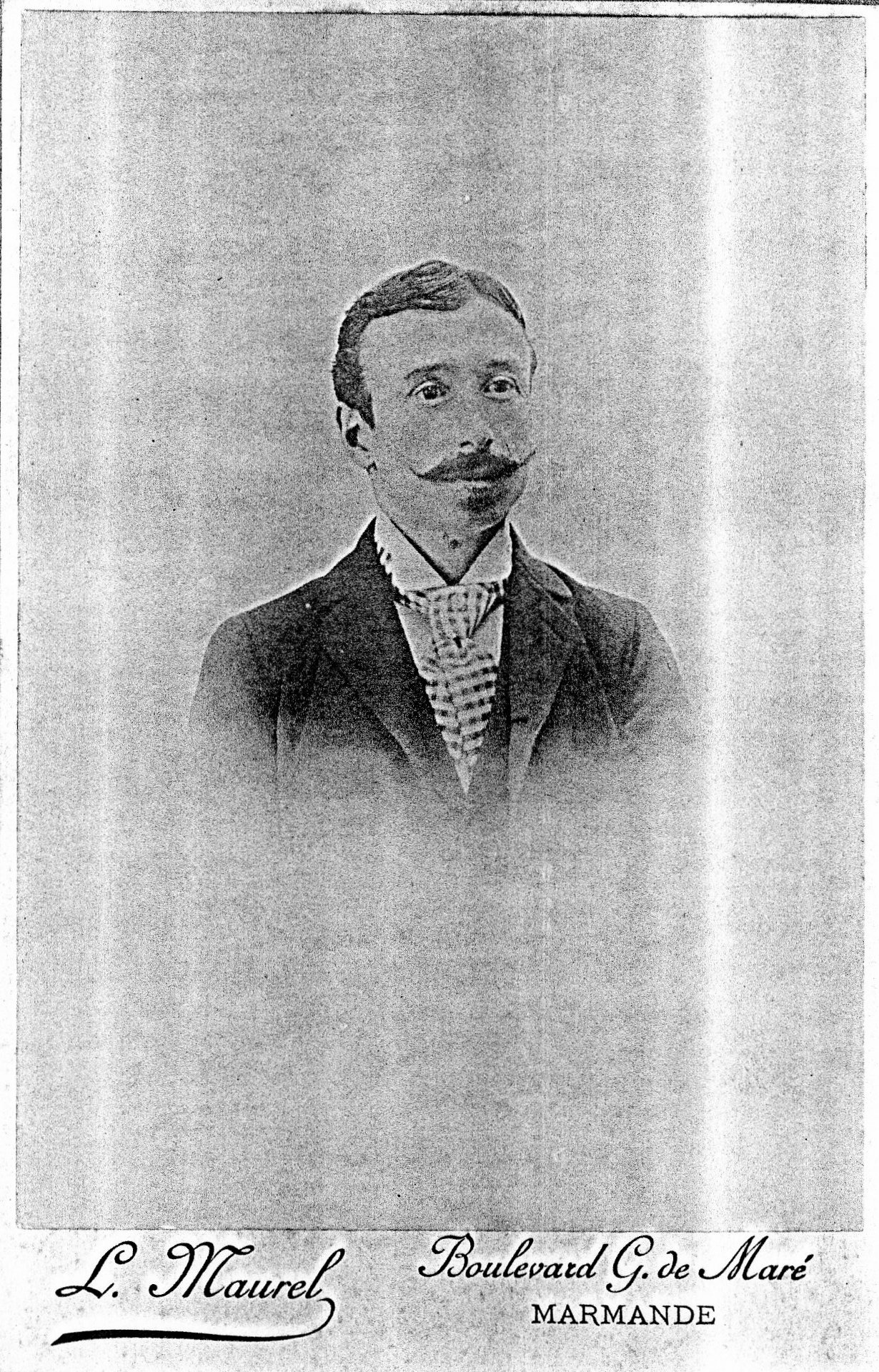

Personal information
- Born: 18 November 1864 Gontaud-de-Nogaret, France
- Died: 31 December 1915 (aged 51) Bordeaux, France

Cycling career
- Sport: Cycling
- Discipline: Road – Tour de France
- Role: Rider
- Rider type: Epicurean Dilettante

Amateur teams
- circa 1880s–1915: Veloce Club de Marmande
- ?: Vice-consul of Union Vélocipédique de France

Major wins
- None; 1905 Tour de France, withdrew after 7 stages; 1907 Tour de France, withdrew during stage 5; 1914 Tour de France, withdrew

Henri Pépin (18 November 1864 – 31 December 1915) was an affluent French racing cyclist who once hired two riders to escort him leisurely through the Tour de France, in which they ate at good restaurants and spent the night in expensive hotels. When he had enough, he paid his assistants – the first domestiques in cycle racing – what they would have earned had they won the Tour and went home by train.

== Tour de France ==
The Tour which made Pépin celebrated started at the Porte Bineau in Paris on 8 July 1907. Pépin, whom reporters quickly turned into a count or a baron (see below) was rider number 59 in a peloton of 112. He had hired two riders, Jean Dargassies and Henri Gauban to ride with him. Far from competing with the favourites, Gustave Garrigou, Émile Georget and Lucien Petit-Breton, Pépin planned to treat the race as a pleasure ride, stopping for lunch when they chose and spending the night in the best hotels they could find.

The race left the Porte Bineau at 5.30am but without Pépin, Gauban and Dargassies. Pierre Chany reports that Pépin was in conversation with a lady, occasionally raising his hat to other women and blowing kisses. The bunch had already left for its eight-hour ride to Roubaix, but only when Pepin was ready did he say:

"Let us depart. But remember – we have all the time in the world."

The three riders never separated, never hurried. They took 12 hours and 20 minutes longer than Georget on the stage from Roubaix to Metz – they were far from last – and the judges were powerless because the race was decided not on time but points. It mattered less what speed riders competed than the order in which they crossed the line. In an era when riders could be separated by hours, there was no point in hurrying after a rival who could not be caught and passed. The judges had to wait for everyone.

One day the trio came across another rider, not on the road but lying in a ditch.

"My name is Jean-Marie Teychenne," the man said. "Like you, I am a coureur. But I have suffered the most terrible fringale [hunger]. Leave me, I'm done for." Pépin recognised the man's accent. Teychenne came from Toulouse. "Nonsense," he shouted, and he told Dargassies and Gauban to pull the man from the gully. "You will join us," he said, slapping him on the back and wiping the mud off his number 76. "We are but three but we live well and we shall finish this race. We may not win, but we shall see France." And they set off, now a foursome, to get Teychenne cleaned and fed at the next inn.

Somewhere between Lyon and Grenoble on stage five – three times the direct distance the way the race went – Pépin pulled out the money he had promised his little team and set off for the train home. Dargassies joined Pépin on the train. Gauban carried on, finishing 36th in stage six, 27th on stage four. By stage eight he was only 36 minutes in arrears, but something happened on stage nine and he dropped behind by 2 hours and 12 minutes. Despite pulling back to an hour and six minutes on stage 10, where he finished 14th, he pulled out on the 11th. It was his fifth and final Tour.

It was also the last Tour for Dargassies, who had come 11th in 1903 and fourth in 1904 before abandoning in 1905 and 1907.

== Nobility myth ==
Henri Pépin, because of his aristocratic-sounding story, is often described as a baron or a count. The Danish writer and television commentator, Svend Novrup, imagined a scene in which Pépin called his assistants to see him:

Two athletic young men entered the beautiful room of a castle near Toulouse. The gorgeous furniture, perfectly hand-crafted, tastefully complemented the decorations on the walls. They were impressed, but they were also curious. Who was this Count Pépin de Gontaud who had asked their help as cyclists? He didn't disappoint. He shone with idealism if one overlooked a bit of a belly. His dress was modern for 1907 and his handlebar moustache was well kept. He addressed his guests in a light tone ...

Gentlemen, as I have hinted in my letter, the reason you are here is bicycle racing. This Tour de France is a magnificent idea that I would like to support. Not only that but I would like to participate, and preferably finish. Now, unlike you gentlemen, I haven't had time to race. I have estates to run and attending to them and a large number of staff is very demanding...

The confusion arose because of the trunk of belongings that Pépin carried with him through the Tour. On it was stenciled "Henri Pépin de Gontaud". The "de" gave the impression of aristocracy and that was what journalists concluded when they were intrigued by his dilettante manners. The truth was more prosaic: Henri Pépin was simply from a village called Gontaud-de-Nogaret, not near Toulouse but on the Toulouse side of Bordeaux. Far from being his name, it was his address.

The house is still there, in the main street. Pépin was described as a propriétaire, or house-owner. The house is substantial but not a château and there are no extensive grounds.

Nor was Pépin a novice to cycling. He rode seven stages of the 1905 Tour de France. He called it a day from Toulouse to Bordeaux, perhaps when he got close to Gontaud. Dargassies also rode the 1905 race and it was probably there they forged their alliance.

A picture of Pépin on the cover of Le Cycle of October 1894 – he was a celebrity even then – shows the normal lean young man of the period, with intense eyes, a weak chin and the obligatory twizzled moustache. More formal studio pictures show him in the slightly effete, Oscar Wilde-like, pose of gentlemen-displaying-their-calves. A more informal picture shows another Pépin. He is in plus-fours and a four-buttoned jacket. The top button is fastened and through it hangs a St Christopher medal. The picture in Le Cycle describes him as a member of the Veloce Club de Marmande.

Pépin was already vice-consul of the Union Vélocipédique de France when in 1897 he published a booklet about how he and a rider called Richard, possibly his son, rode a tandem from Paris to Agen in 57 hours and 45 minutes They were joined by their trainer, Louis Lambert, on a bicycle.

Their account starts:

Set off from Paris on Friday 21 June 1895 at 5.25am from the Porte Maillot, where Monsieur Haufert, timekeeper of the Union, gave us the starting signal, we crossed the Bois de Boulogne towards Versailles. The weather was cold, that damp coldness of some mornings in June which makes you search for a light jacket and freezes your hands; but we were full of ardour, replete with good advice and lots of energy and it was happily that Richard and I on the tandem and our trainer Lambert on a bicycle started our long journey for the record from Paris to Agen.

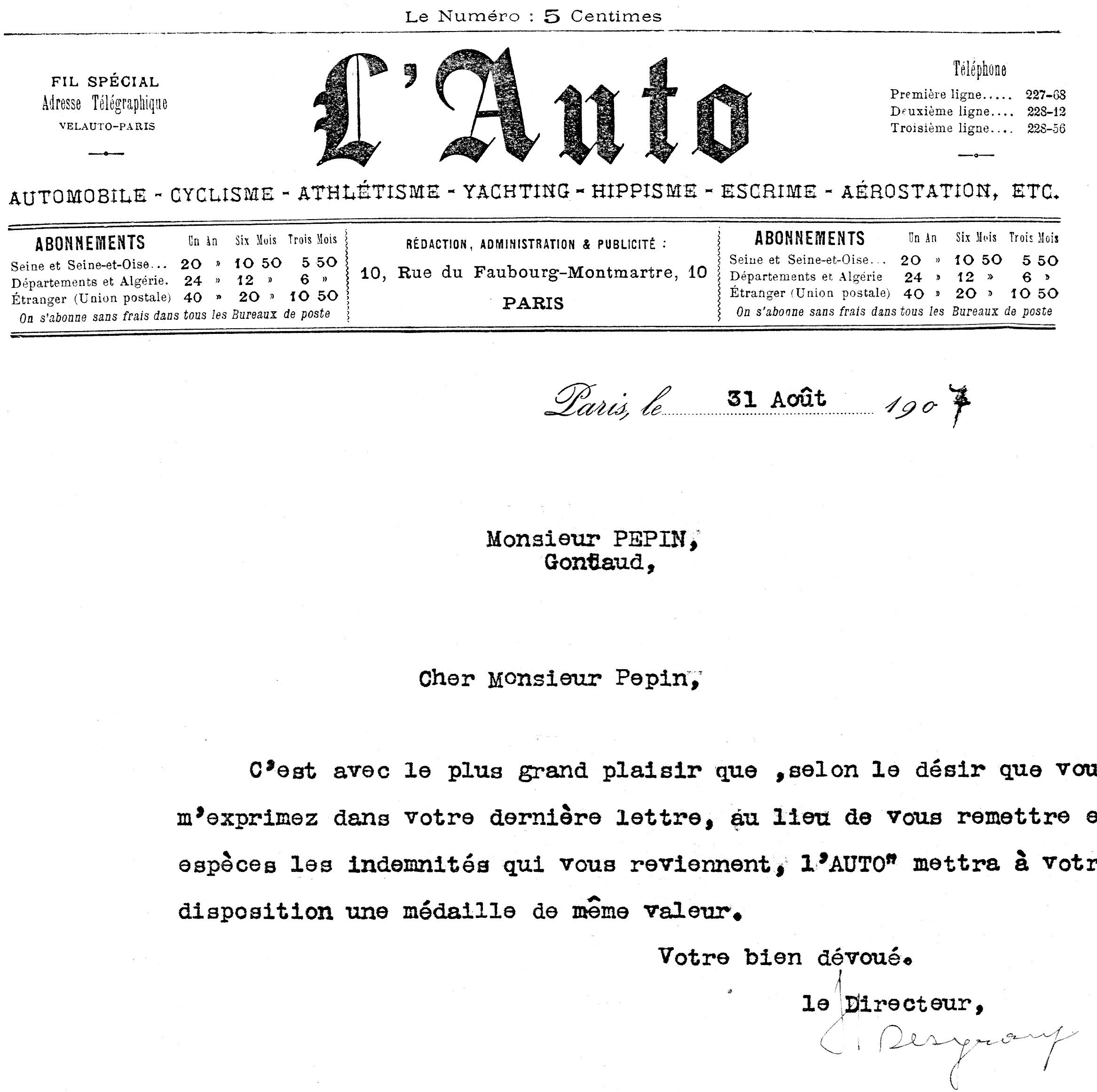
The letter from L'Auto promising Pépin a medal in lieu of his allowances.

It ends:

The trees passed with an unseen speed, feverish enthusiasm filled our arteries, we lifted our machine with the effort of our pushing, the cyclists who accompanied us, although they were fresh, could not follow us, and it was with happiness that we waved to them from the top of the Petites Soeurs hill in that town of Agen so distant, so desired. A splendid woman gave us flowers there and it was in a whirlwind of dust that we arrived at the Gravier velodrome, in the middle of a crowd of people gathered for the bicycle races and to applaud our arrival. All Agen was there.

Pépin, while not a château-owning aristocrat, did have the leisure of not working. Nor did he lack money, which he made clear to the organiser of the Tour de France. Henri Desgrange replied:

Dear Mr Pépin, it is with great pleasure that, according to the desire you expressed in your last letter, instead of sending you cash for the allowances owed to you, L'Auto will provide you with a medal to the same value.

Pépin also toured Europe by bicycle and amassed a collection of photographs, many of them made by heavy glass negatives which he carried with him.

== Death ==
Pépin died in Bordeaux in 1915 of "athleticism", which could mean a coronary attributed to a heart enlarged by sport. He had started his third Tour de France that summer.
