= Jean Dargassies =

French cyclist

Personal information
- Full name: Jean Dargassies
- Born: 15 July 1872 Grisolles, Tarn-et-Garonne, France
- Died: 7 August 1965 (aged 93) Grisolles, Tarn-et-Garonne, France

Cycling career
- Sport: Cycling
- Discipline: Road
- Role: Rider and Domestique

Professional teams
- 1903: Gladiator (France)
- 1904: Gladiator
- 1905: Alcyon - Dunlop (France)
- 1906: Unknown
- 1907: Unknown

Major wins
- None known 1903 - 11th Tour de France; 1904 - 2nd Bordeaux-Paris; 1904 - 4th Tour de France; 1905 - Retired on Stage 5 (indigestion)

Jean Dargaties, known as Jean Dargassies (born Grisolles, Tarn-et-Garonne, France, 15 July 1872, died Grisolles, 7 August 1965) was a French racing cyclist who rode the first Tour de France because the man who sold him a bike told him he ought to. He rode it three times, coming 11th in 1903 and fourth in 1904. In 1907 he was part of Henri Pepin's experimental team that 'voyaged' rather than 'raced' its way around France.

== Background ==
Jean Dargassies was a blacksmith in the village of Grisolles, north of Toulouse. The town's main industry was broom-making. The forge was at 4 avénue de la République. He was "not very tall but well built, with thighs and calves like the pillars of a cathedral." He had a spreading blond moustache. In a picture of the forge, he is posing beside a horse, a broad leather belt round his waist, a hammer in his hand. His mother wears an ankle-length striped dress and a bonnet. Two other men in the family, probably his brothers, are also there. All four are wearing wooden clogs.

Dargassies' father was also a blacksmith, his mother a housewife [ménagère]. Jean was the second son. The oldest brother, Jérome, was destined to take over the business.

== Entering the Tour de France ==
Legend says that Dargassies bought a bicycle so that he could ride 25 km to Montauban, as far to the north as Toulouse was to the south. Nobody in the family had left the immediate area. The shop owner had heard of a new race, the Tour de France, to be promoted that summer. He looked him up and down and said: "You could ride that, with muscles like yours." Dargassies wrote to L'Auto to say he wanted to take part. By the days before the start, he had heard nothing. He went to Paris anyway to meet the race director, Géo Lefèvre. There were few entrants from the south and Lefèvre, a Parisian, was entranced by Dargassie's country ways and his marked southern accent. He recounted the meeting in L'Auto:

"My name is Dargassies and I've come from Grisolles."
"Where?"
"From Grisolles, near Montauban, and I've come to make inquiries."
"About?"
"Inquiries about the Tour de France."
"But... You're already entered, I think.
"Heavens, yes, [pardi], I've entered! I just wanted to know what's going to happen."
"You haven't read L'Auto?"
L'Auto? I don't think anyone reads that in Monnetaubanne.'" (Lefèvre took pleasure in reproducing Dargassie's pronounce-every-letter southern accent.)
"Where?"
"Monnetaubanne, Tarn-et-Garonne."
"Oh, Montauban!"
"Yes. The man who sold me my bike told me there was a Tour de France race and he said: 'Dargaties, you're made for that.'"

Dargaties was the blacksmith's real name. Lefèvre misheard it. Jean Dargaties became known as Jean Dargassies. Lefèvre asked: "Tell me, have you ever actually ridden a cycle race?" Dargassies replied: "No, but I've ridden from Grisolles to Montauban and back and I didn't even have to try. I'm a blacksmith; I'm not worried about tiredness."

== Riding the Tour de France ==
The first Tour de France started at Montgeron, south of Paris. By Toulouse he was one of 30 left in the race. With them he left the city in the night and led the race as it passed through his village. Lefèvre reported: "The whole of Grisolles is by the side of the road. They're here to see Dargassies, the champion of the region. When he rode by, every voice shouted in encouragement, in a long avenue of people all the way to Montauban."

Dargassies was three minutes behind the leaders as he came through Montauban and his front fork had broken. As a blacksmith, he had no trouble finding a colleague to make a repair. In Paris he finished 11th, 13 hours behind the winner, Maurice Garin. His prize: 145 francs. When he got home to Grisolles he sent a telegram to Lefèvre: "Got back home today. All my compatriots are crazy, crazier than me. Everybody at the station, music, flowers, speech. Fame! Fame!" He rode the Tour again in 1904 and finished fourth, lifted from 10th by disqualifications of the best riders for cheating. This time he won 1,000 francs.

== The first domestique ==
Dargassies rode the Tour in 1905. There he met another rider, Henri Pépin, a prosperous landowner from Gontaud-de-Nogaret, east of Bordeaux. The two made a deal that Dargassies and another rider, Henri Gauban, would pace Pépin round the 1907 event. Instead of racing, they would take their time, stop at good restaurants, spend the night in the best hotels they could find. In return, Pépin would pay his helpers what they would have received had they won the race.

As hired hands sacrificing their own hopes for their leader's, Dargassies and Gauban became cycling's first domestiques, although the word wasn't coined until later.

The three riders never separated. They took 12 hours and 20 minutes longer than Émile Georget on the stage from Roubaix to Metz and the judges were powerless because the race was decided not on time but points. It mattered not what speed riders managed than the order in which they crossed the line. The judges had to wait for everyone. Pépin pulled out between Lyon and Grenoble on stage five, paid the money he had promised and set off for the train home. Dargassies joined him. Gauban pulled out on the 11th. It was Dargassies' last Tour.

== Retirement and death ==
Dargassies retired and ran first a food shop and then a bike shop, at the junction of the rue Faugère and the rue de Lumel in Grisolles. He died 1965, when he was 93. He is buried in the town's cemetery under his original name, Dargaties. Schools are named after him in Eaunes, Haute-Garonne and at nearby Portet-sur-Garonne. His bike is in the town museum at Montauban.

== Palmarès ==
- 1903 - 11th Tour de France
- 1904 - 2nd Bordeaux-Paris
- 1904 - 4th Tour de France

== Teams ==
- 1903: Gladiator (France)
- 1904: Gladiator
- 1905: Alcyon - Dunlop (France)
- 1906: Unknown
- 1907: Unknown
