= 1907 Milan–San Remo =

Race details
- Dates: 14 April
- Stages: 1
- Distance: 288 km (179 mi)
- Winning time: 11h 04' 15"

Results
| | Winner | Lucien Petit-Breton (France) | (Bianchi) |
| | Second | Gustave Garrigou (France) | (Peugeot) |
| | Third | Giovanni Gerbi (Italy) | (Bianchi) |

The 1907 Milan–San Remo was the first edition of the Milan–San Remo, a classic one-day cycle race organised by La Gazzetta dello Sport in Italy. The single day event was held on 14 April 1907 and stretched 288 km (179 mi) from Milan to its end in Sanremo. The winner was Lucien Petit-Breton from France.

33 riders rode the 288 km course, starting at 4 am.

== Organisation ==
Eugenio Costamagna (manager of La Gazzetta dello Sport) was the man with the vision. After being approached by the Unione Sportiva Sanremese with idea of finishing a cycle race in San Remo, Costamagna decided on Milan as a starting point, connecting the hub of the Italian cycling industry with the hub of tourism.

A route was decided on that included Passo di Turchino and Costamagna had no idea if the route was humanly possible. He invited top cyclists of the time to test the course in the 1907 edition of the race.

The race rules made the event even harder; no changing of bicycles, no supplies or accessories and no team support was allowed.

== The race ==
62 riders had signed up to ride, but at 4 am on 14 April 1907 it was cold and windy and only 33 riders set off.

90 km into the race Giovanni Gerbi, known as "the red devil", attacked the lead group through the sleet on the climb of the Turchino gaining 3 minutes by the summit. He was caught by Gustave Garrigou in Savona. Gerbi decided to play the team card and waited for his Bianchi teammate Lucien Petit-Breton. The three entered the outskirts of San Remo together. Gerbi then impeded Garrigou allowing Petit-Breton to attack and gain a lead of a minute and winning the first ever Milan - San Remo. Gerbi finished ahead of the angered Garrigou who complained to the jury and was subsequently promoted to second. The fourth placed Luigi Ganna arrived over thirty minutes later. Only 14 riders finished.

== Results ==
Final results (1-10)
| Rank | Cyclist | Time |
|---|---|---|
| 1 | Lucien Petit-Breton (FRA) | 11h 04' 15" |
| 2 | Gustave Garrigou (FRA) | + 35" |
| 3 | Giovanni Gerbi (ITA) | s.t. |
| 4 | Luigi Ganna (ITA) | + 32' 45" |
| 5 | Carlo Galetti (ITA) | + 32' 57" |
| 6 | Eberardo Pavesi (ITA) | + 1h 07' 45" |
| 7 | Giovanni Cuniolo (ITA) | + 1h 36' 45" |
| 8 | Philippe Pautrat (FRA) | + 1h 53' 45" |
| 9 | Clemente Canepari (ITA) | + 1h 54' 01" |
| 10 | Amleto Belloni (ITA) | + 1h 54' 04" |

Final results (11–14)
| Rank | Cyclist | Time |
|---|---|---|
| 11 | Mario Gaioni (ITA) | + 2h 08' 45" |
| 12 | Giovanni Rossignoli (ITA) | + 2h 39' 45" |
| 13 | Guido Rabajoli (ITA) | + 3h 42' 15"" |
| 14 | Luigi Rota (ITA) | s.t. |
