= Gontaud-de-Nogaret =

- Commune
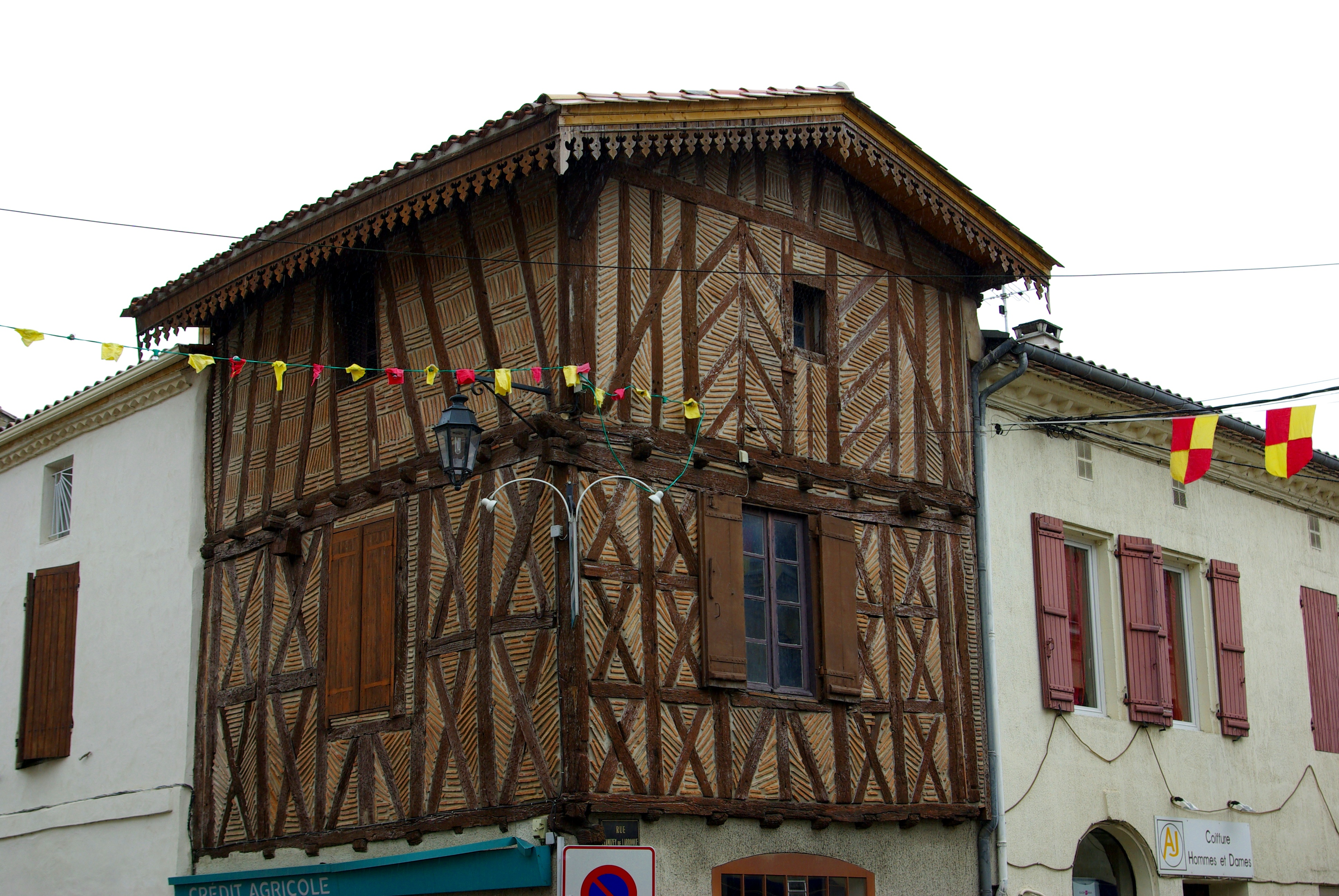
- A half-timbered house in Gontaud-de-Nogaret

- Coat of arms
- Location of Gontaud-de-Nogaret
- Location within France Location within Nouvelle-Aquitaine
- Coordinates: 44°27′25″N 0°17′44″E
- Country: France
- Region: Nouvelle-Aquitaine
- Department: Lot-et-Garonne
- Arrondissement: Marmande
- Canton: Marmande-2
- Intercommunality: Val de Garonne Agglomération

Government
  - Mayor (2020–2026): Christian Jambon
- Area^{1}: 29.51 km^{2} (11.39 sq mi)
- Elevation: 45 m (148 ft)
- Highest elevation: 132 m (433 ft)
- Lowest elevation: 26 m (85 ft)
- Population (2023): 1,638
  - Density: 55.51/km^{2} (143.8/sq mi)
- Time zone: UTC+01:00 (CET)
  - Summer (DST): UTC+02:00 (CEST)
- INSEE/Postal code: 47110 /47400
- ^{1} French Land Register data, which excludes lakes, ponds, glaciers > 1 km^{2} (0.386 sq mi or 247 acres) and river estuaries.

Gontaud-de-Nogaret (French pronunciation: [ɡɔ̃to də nɔɡaʁɛ]; Occitan: Gontaud de Nogaret) is a commune in the Lot-et-Garonne department in south-western France.

== People ==
The village was the home of Henri Pépin, a prosperous houseowner and cycling enthusiast who employed two helpers to pace him around the Tour de France in 1906. Pépin—sometimes wrongly described as a baron—had no interest in winning the race. Instead, he paid his helpers to lead him to the best restaurants and hotels they could find. Some days they finished more than 12 hours behind the winner.

== See also ==
- Communes of the Lot-et-Garonne department
