= Clovis Lacroix =

French cyclist

Personal information
- Full name: Clovis Lacroix

Cycling career
- Sport: Cycling
- Role: Rider

Clovis Lacroix was a French racing cyclist. He finished in last place in the 1905 Tour de France.
