= Camille Fily =

French cyclist

Personal information
- Born: 13 May 1887 Preuilly-sur-Claise, France
- Died: 11 May 1918 (aged 30) Kemmel, Belgium (now Heuvelland)

Cycling career
- Sport: Cycling
- Discipline: Road
- Role: Rider

Professional teams
- 1904: Veuve Fily–Dunlop
- 1905: Guérin Cycles

Camille Fily (13 May 1887 – 11 May 1918) was a French road racing cyclist active in the early 1900s. He is known for being the youngest rider to have ever participated in the Tour de France, entering the race at the age of just 17.

== Biography ==
Fily was born in Preuilly-sur-Claise, a small town south of Tours. He began his cycling career with the Société Vélocipédique Lochoise, where he received his early training.

In 1904, Fily started his first Tour de France, the second edition of the Tour de France. At only 17 years and 50 days old, he remains the youngest competitor in Tour history. He initially finished ninth overall, an impressive result for his age. However, he was disqualified due to rule violations; common in what became one of the most controversial editions of the Tour, marred by widespread cheating and disqualifications.

He returned to the Tour in 1905, finishing 14th overall. It was his last appearance in a competitive cycling event.

During World War I, Fily was conscripted into the 8th Infantry Regiment. On 11 May 1918, while delivering a message by bicycle near Kemmel (now part of Heuvelland), he was fatally shot in the head, just two days before his 31st birthday. His older brother Georges Fily, born in 1882, had died at Verdun in May 1916. Fily's nephew, Georges Henri Fily (b. 1907), later served as president of the Société Vélocipédique Lochoise from 1946 to 1977. A local cycling race, the "Grand Prix de Loches – Souvenir Georges Fily" is named in his honor.

== Major results ==
- 1904
  - ~~9th overall, 1904 Tour de France~~ (DQ)
- 1905
  - 10th, Bordeaux–Paris
  - 14th overall, 1905 Tour de France
