= Jean-Baptiste Dortignacq =

French cyclist

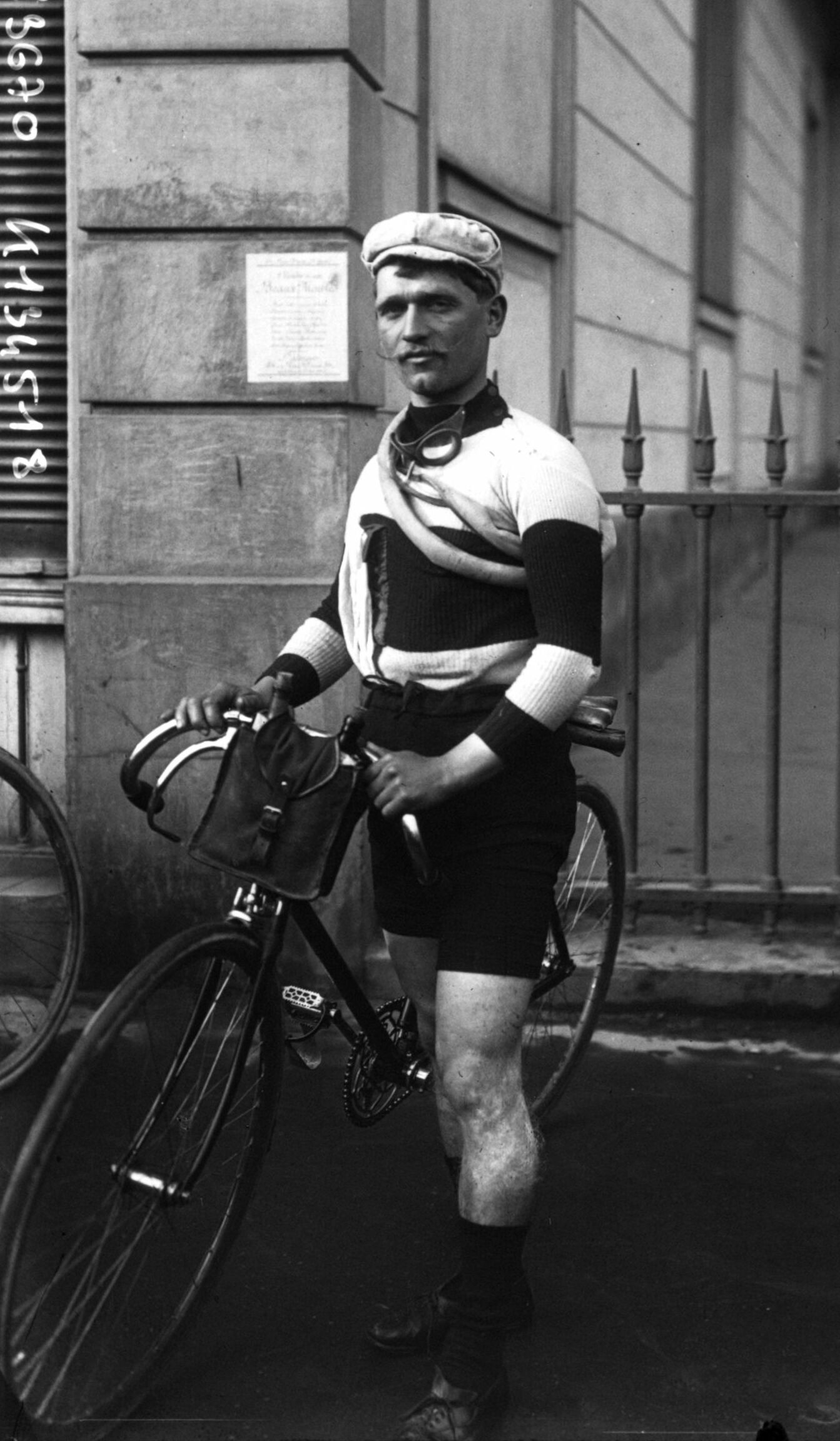
- Dortignacq in 1909

Personal information
- Full name: Jean-Baptiste Dortignacq
- Born: 25 April 1884 Arudy, France
- Died: 13 May 1928 (aged 44) Peyrehorade, France

Cycling career
- Sport: Cycling
- Discipline: Road
- Role: Rider

Major wins
- Grand Tours Tour de France 7 individual stages (1904-1906, 1908) Giro d'Italia 1 individual stage (1910) One-day races and Classics Giro della Romagna (1910) Paris–La Mer (1909)

Jean-Baptiste Dortignacq (25 April 1884 – 13 May 1928) was a French road bicycle racer between 1900 and 1910. Dortignacq won seven stages in four Tour de France events. He only competed in stage 4 of the first Tour de France in 1903, finishing 11th on the stage.

== Major results ==
1903
Tour de France

11th, Stage 4 (Toulouse - Bordeaux)

1904
Tour de France

2nd overall, + 2h16'14"
1st, Stage 5 (Bordeaux - Nantes) 425 km
1st, Stage 6 (Nantes - Paris) 471 km

1905
Tour de France

3rd overall, + 2h16'14"
1st, Stage 6 (Nîmes - Toulouse) 307 km
1st, Stage 10 (Rennes - Caen) 167 km
1st, Stage 11 (Caen - Paris) 253 km

1906
Tour de France

Did Not Finish, abandon 10th stage
1st, Stage 8 (Toulouse - Bayonne) 300 km

1908
Tour de France

Did Not Finish, abandon 8th stage
1st, Stage 5 (Grenoble - Nice) 345 km

1909
Bordeaux-Toulouse
1910
Giro di Romagna
Giro d'Italia

Did Not Finish
1st, Stage 2 (Udine - Bologna) 322 km (first victory of a non-Italian racer in the Giro)
