= Philippe Pautrat =

French cyclist (1884–1944)

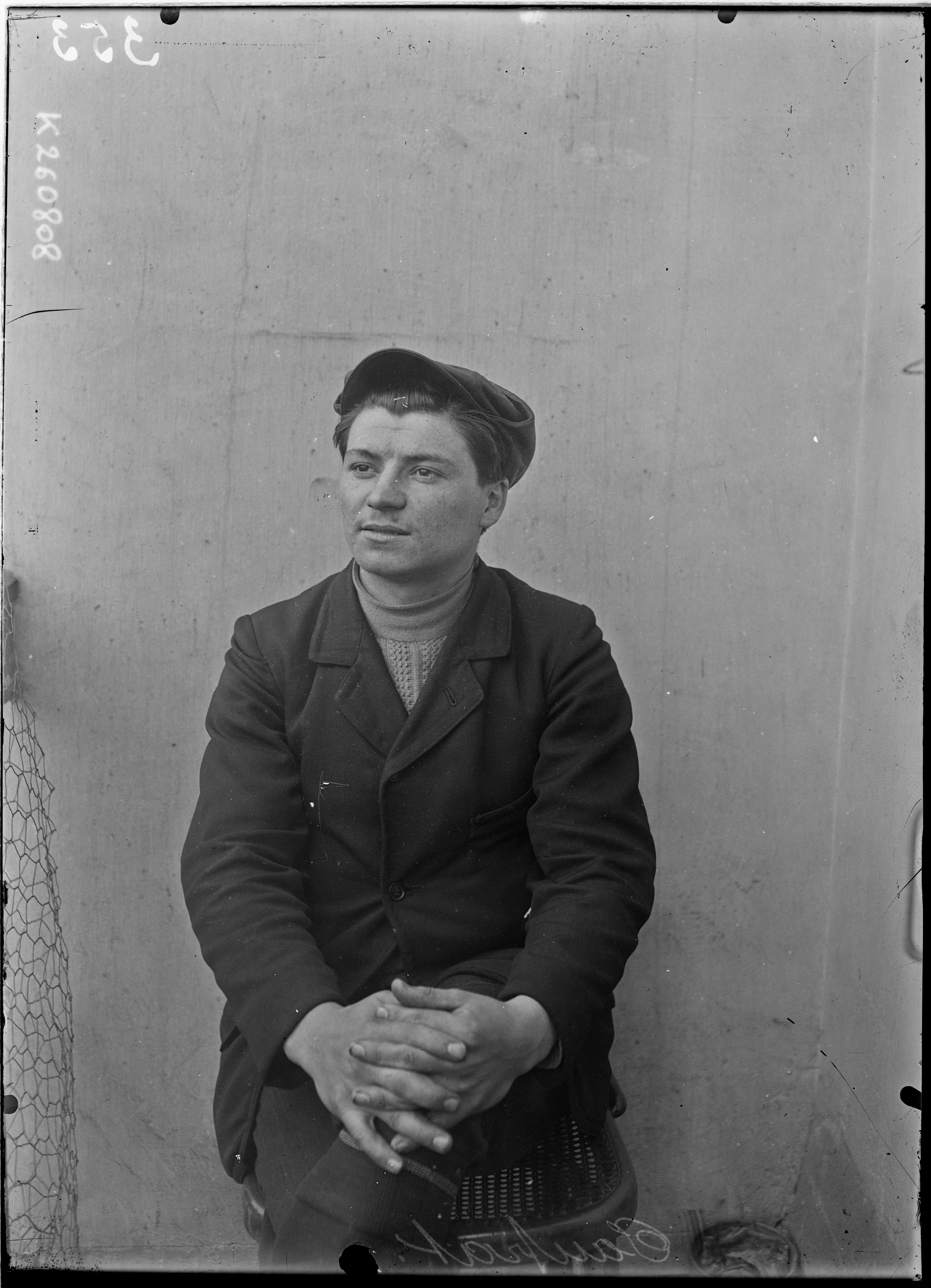
- Pautrat in 1905

Personal information
- Born: Raymond Philippe Pautrat; 18 June 1884 Villeneuve-sur-Lot, France
- Died: 28 May 1944

Cycling career
- Sport: Cycling
- Current team: Retired
- Discipline: Road
- Role: Rider

Professional teams
- 1901–1904: Individual
- 1905–1906: JC Cycles
- 1907: Peugeot-Lecour
- 1908: Alcyon-Dunlop
- 1909–1910: Individual
- Jan–Jun 1911: Le Globe-Dunlop
- Jul–Dec 1911: Panneton-Dunlop
- 1920–1921: Individual

Raymond Philippe Pautrat (18 June 1884 – 28 May 1944) was a professional French road racing cyclist who during the early 20th century.

== Career ==
He is most known for his eight pace overall on the 1905 Tour de France and had in stage 7 a podium finish. He competed in total four editions of the Tour de France. He also competed in the other monument and classic cycling races in his era and achieved among other the eight place in 1907 Milan–San Remo, the sixth place in 1911 Paris–Tours and the same year the seventh place in Bordeaux-Paris. He rode to the podium in among others Paris-Montargis and Paris-Honfleur.

== Career highlights ==
1904
2nd Paris–Fontainebleau
2nd Paris-Montargis

1905
3rd Paris-Honfleur
8th overall in the 1905 Tour de France

6th stage 3
7th stage 4
8th stage 5
2th stage 7
6th stage 9
5th stage 10

1907
8th 1907 Milan–San Remo

1908
2nd Paris–Abbeville
1911
7th Bordeaux-Paris
6th 1911 Paris–Tours

Grand Tour general classification results
Race	1905	1907	1908	1911
Tour de France	8th	19th	DNF	DNF

Major Classic results
Monument	1905	1907	1910	1911
Milan–San Remo	NH	8th	—	—
Paris–Tours	NH	—	—	6th
Paris–Roubaix	10th	—	39th	—
Classic	1905	1907	1910	1911
Bordeaux–Paris	—	—	—	7th
Paris-Brussels	NH	14th	—	—
