= Paul Chauvet =

French cyclist (1883–1952)

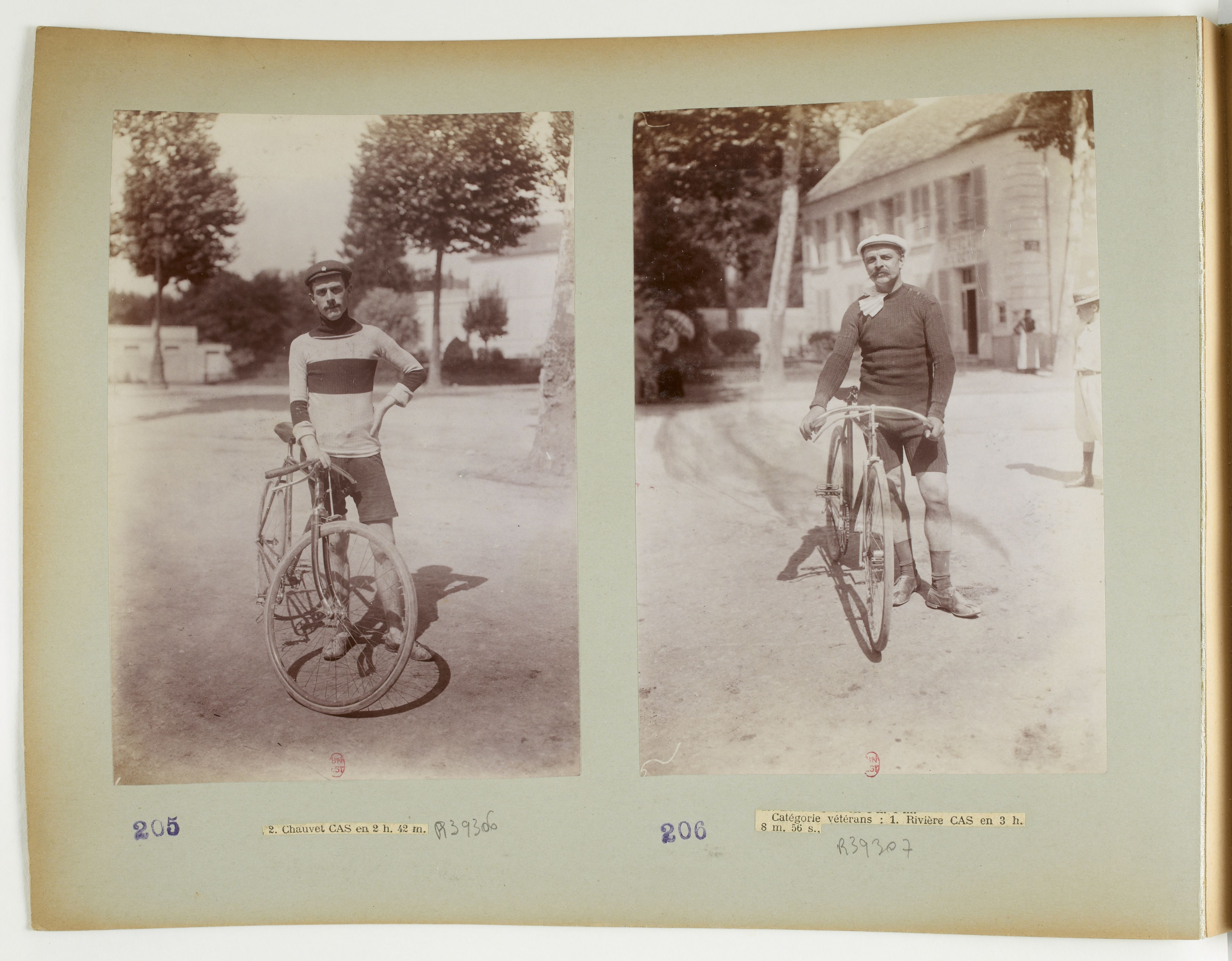
- Chauvet in 1904

Personal information
- Born: 18 March 1883 Paris (17th arrondissement), France
- Died: 4 September 1952 (aged 69) Rueil-la-Gadelière, France

Cycling career
- Sport: Cycling
- Discipline: Road
- Role: Rider

Professional team
- 1908: Peugeot-Wolber

Paul Chauvet (18 March 1883 – 4 September 1952) was a French professional road cyclist active in the early 20th century. He was notable for finishing seventh overall in the 1905 Tour de France, eighth in the 1905 Paris–Roubaix, and 14th in the 1908 Tour de France.

== Biography ==
Chauvet first rode the Tour de France in 1905, competing as an individual rider without team support, and achieved a top-10 finish in the general classification. In the following years, he did not participate in the Tour but remained active at a high level, placing twice in the top 10 at Paris–Tours in 1906 and 1907. In 1908, riding for Peugeot-Wolber, he finished 14th in the Tour de France, working in support of his team leader Lucien Petit-Breton. He returned for the 1909 Tour de France but abandoned during the 5th stage.

== Major results ==
1905
4th Bordeaux–Paris
4th Bol d'Or (24-hour track race)
7th Overall 1905 Tour de France
8th 1905 Paris–Roubaix
1906
6th Paris–Tours
1907
7th Paris–Tours

=== Grand Tour general classification results ===
Stage races	1905	1908	1909
Tour de France	7th	14th	DNF
