= Julien Gabory =

French cyclist (born 1880)

- Julien Gabory in 1912

Personal information
- Born: 30 November 1880 Paris, France
- Died: 20th century
- Weight: 77 kg (170 lb)

Cycling career
- Sport: Cycling
- Discipline: Road
- Role: Rider

Professional teams
- 1904: Audax
- 1905: Cycles JC
- 1906: Peugeot
- 1909: Le Globe
- 1910–1911: Le Globe–Dunlop

Julien Gabory (30 November 1880 — 20th century) was a French professional road cyclist.

He competed between 1901 and 1919 and was professional between 1904 and 1911. He is most known for finishing ninth overall in the 1905 Tour de France.

== Career ==
Gabory became professional in 1904 riding with Audax, later followed by Cycles JC, Peugeot and Le Globe. His best-known result was in the second edition of the Tour de France, held in 1905, where he finished 9th in the general classification. He had a total of seven top-10 achievements in Tour de France stages. Gabory also competed in the other main cycling races in his era, like 1906 Paris–Tours and finished seventh in Bordeaux–Paris. At the end of his career, after his professional career, in 1919 he still had a podium finish in Nice-Annot-Nice.

== Major results ==
1904
1904 Tour de France

7th stage 1
9th stage 5

1905
9th Overall 1905 Tour de France

9th stage 1
8th stage 2
9th stage 5
9th stage 7

7th Bordeaux–Paris

1909
10th stage 3 1909 Tour de France

1919
3rd Nice-Annot-Nice

=== General classification results timeline ===
Grand Tour general classification results
Race	1904	1905	1906	1907	1909	1911	1914
Tour de France	DNF	9th	DQ	DQ	DNF	DNF	DNF
Major stage race general classification results

Major Classic results
Monument	1905	1906	1909	1911
Paris–Tours	NH	11th	—	—
Classic	1905	1906	1909	1911
Bordeaux–Paris	7th	—	—	—
Paris–Brussels	NH	—	25th	—
Paris–Brest–Paris	NH	NH	NH	21st

Legend
—	Did not compete
DNF	Did not finish
DQ	Disqualified
NH	Not held
