= Maurice Decaup =

French cyclist (1885–1925)

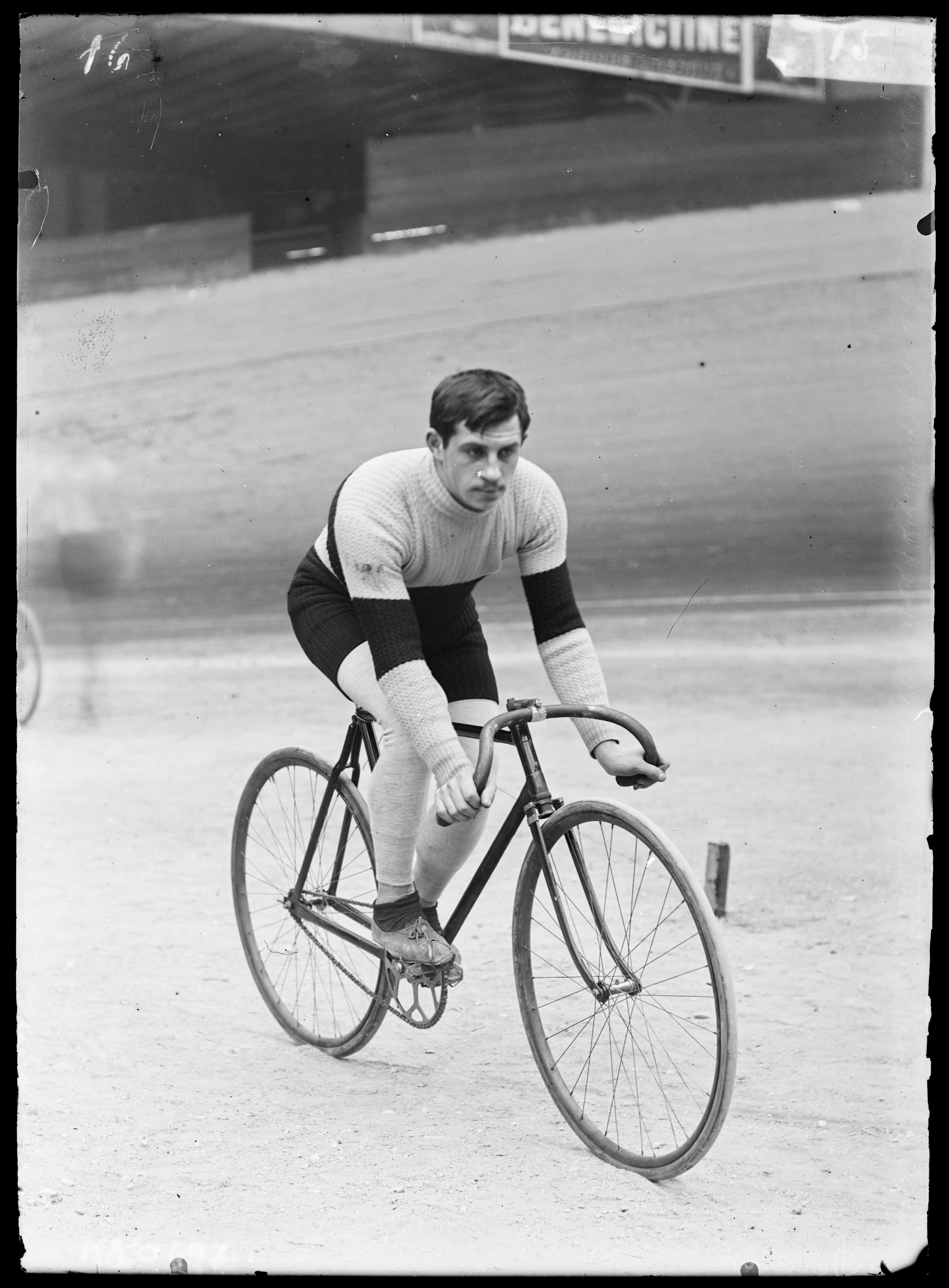
- Decaup in 1904

Personal information
- Born: 7 April 1885 Paris, France
- Died: 14 June 1925 (aged 40)
- Height: 1.65 m (5 ft 5 in)

Cycling career
- Sport: Cycling
- Disciplines: Road, Track
- Role: Rider

Professional teams
- 1906: Peugeot
- 1907: Alcyon–Dunlop
- 1910: Legnano

Major wins
- Paris–Troyes (1902)

Maurice Decaup (7 April 1885 – 14 June 1925) was a French professional road and track cyclist. He won the inaugural Paris–Troyes in 1902 and later competed in three editions of the Tour de France, recording four stage podium finishes in the 1905 Tour de France.

== Biography ==
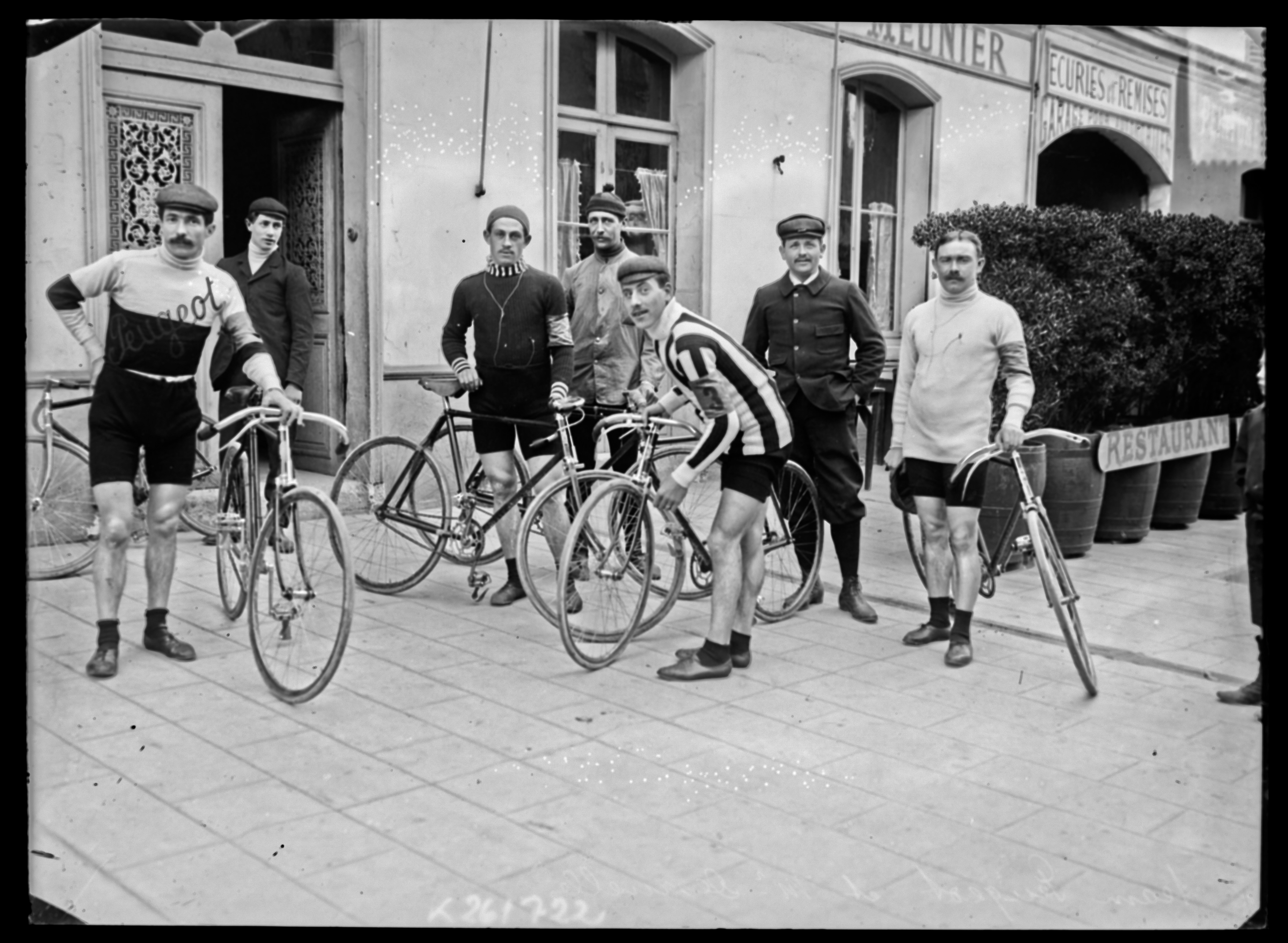
Decaup as member of the 1906 Peugeot Cycling Team

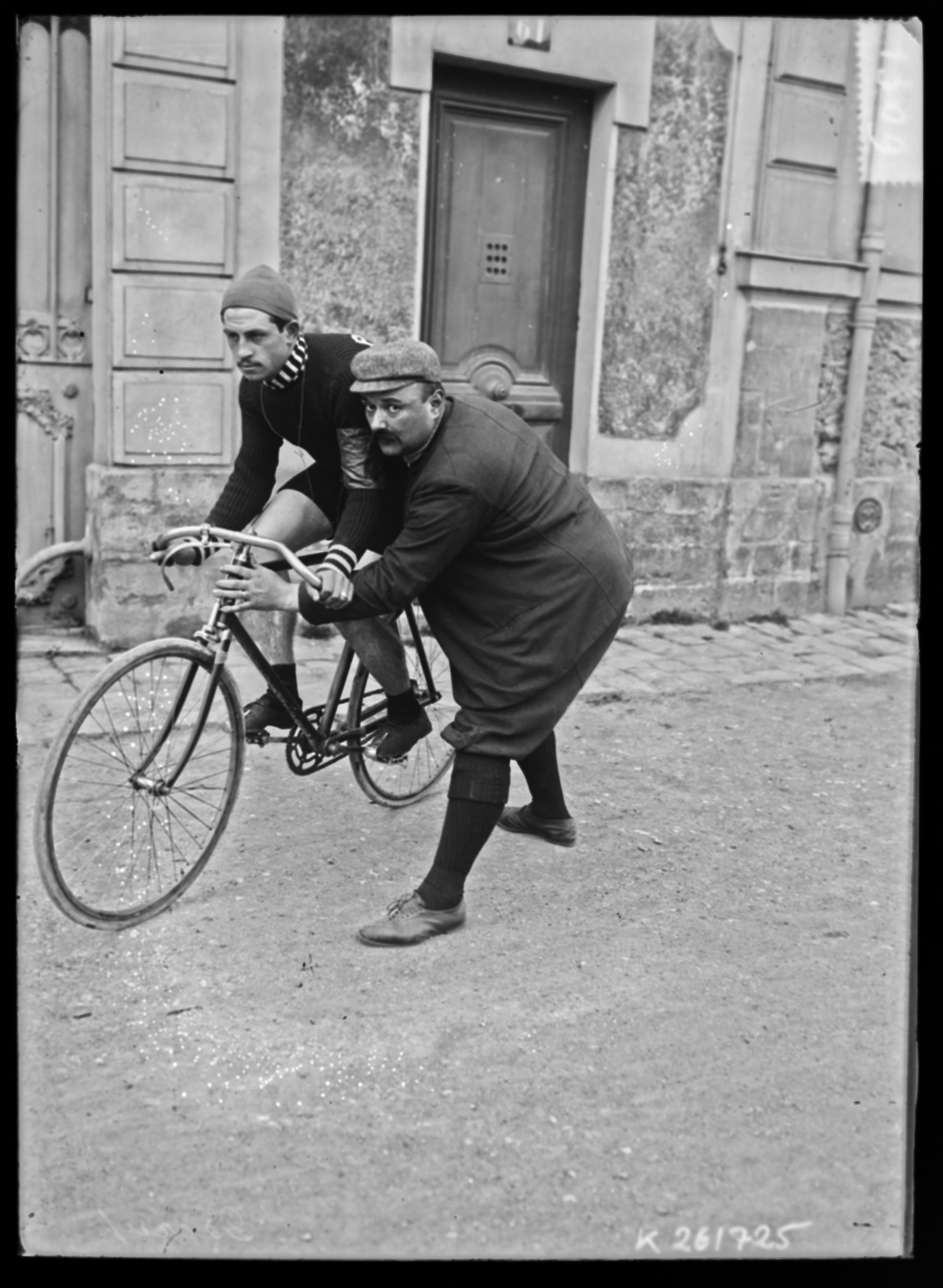
Decaup before the start of the 1906 Paris–Roubaix

Decaup was born in Paris on 7 April 1885. At the age of 17, he won the inaugural edition of Paris–Troyes in 1902. He later became better known for his performances in the early Tours de France, especially the 1905 edition, in which he finished 17th overall and recorded four stage podium finishes, including three second places and one third place.

Following the 1905 Tour de France, Decaup turned professional with Peugeot for the 1906 season, riding the 1906 Tour de France. He joined Alcyon–Dunlop in 1907 and finished nineteenth in 1907 Paris–Tours. In 1909 he started cycling the main international cycling races in Italy. He rode the inaugural edition of the 1909 Giro d'Italia and placed twelfth in 1909 Milan–San Remo. His final professional season was with Legnano in 1910, when he made his third and final Tour de France appearance.

He died on 14 June 1925 at the age of 40 years old.

== Major results ==
1902
1st Paris–Troyes

1905
17th Overall Tour de France

2nd Stage 5
3rd Stage 7
2nd Stage 9
2nd Stage 10

=== Grand Tour and classic results timeline ===
Grand Tour	1905	1906	1907	1909	1910
Tour de France	17th	DNF	—	—	29th
Giro d'Italia	—	—	—	DNF	—
Monument	1905	1906	1907	1909	1910
Milan–San Remo	—	—	—	12th	—
Paris–Roubaix	—	DNF	—	—	49th
Paris–Tours	—	—	19th	—	—
