= Augustin Ringeval =

French cyclist

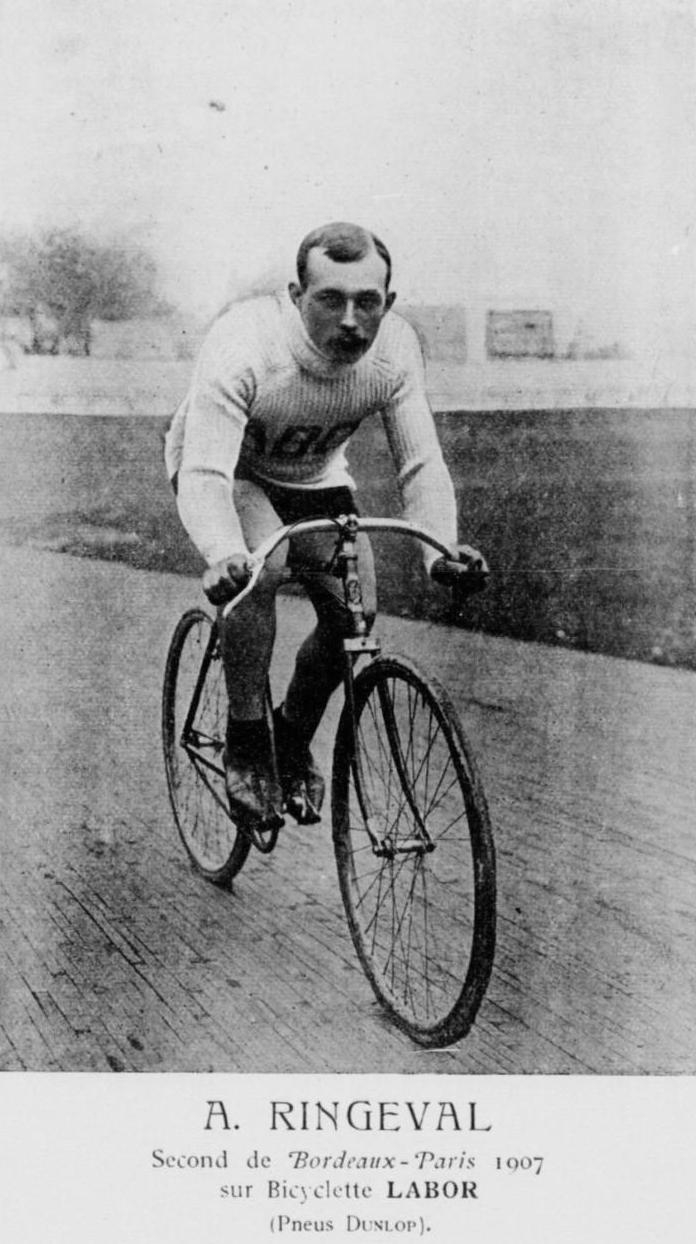

Personal information
- Full name: Augustin Ringeval
- Born: 13 April 1882 Aubigny-aux-Kaisnes, France
- Died: 5 July 1967 (aged 85)

Cycling career
- Sport: Cycling
- Discipline: Road
- Role: Rider

Professional team
- 1905–1913: –

Augustin Ringeval was a French cyclist of the early 1900s. He was born in Aubigny-aux-Kaisnes in 1882.

Among other competitions, he participated in his first Tour de France in 1905. He went on to participate in many other Tours until 1913,

He died in 1967.

== Major competitions ==
- 1905 Tour de France – 6th place
- 1906 Tour de France – did not finish
- 1907 Tour de France – 8th place
- 1908 Tour de France – did not finish
- 1909 Tour de France – did not finish
- 1910 Tour de France – 19th place
- 1912 Tour de France – 30th place
- 1913 Tour de France – did not finish
