= Henri Lignon =

French cyclist

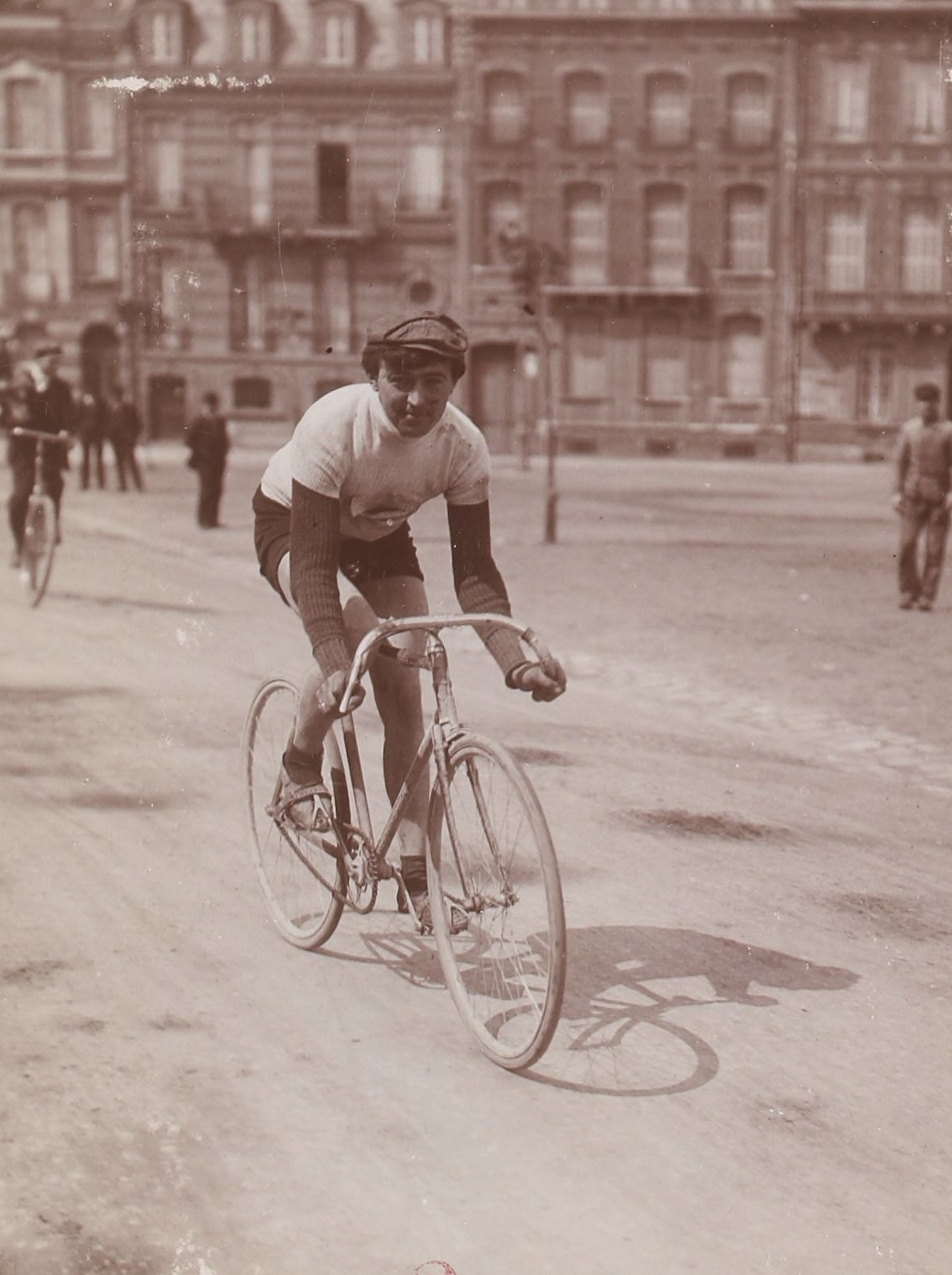
- Henri Lignon (Paris-Dieppe 1907)

Personal information
- Born: 1884 Lunéville, Lorraine
- Died: 1 November 1935 (aged 50–51) Tarbes, Hautes-Pyrénées

Cycling career
- Sport: Cycling
- Discipline: Road
- Role: Rider

Professional teams
- 1905: JC Cycles
- 1907–1909: Alcyon – Dunlop
- 1910: Legnano
- 1910–1911: Alcyon – Dunlop
- 1913: Griffon – Continental
- 1914: Alleluia Continental

Henri Lignon (1884 – 1 November 1935) was a French cyclist. He was second place twice in the French National Road Race Championships in 1907 and 1909, and sixteenth of the Tour de France in 1905.

== Palmarès ==
1905

16th of the Tour de France

1907

2nd of the French National Road Race Championships

1909

Reims-Nancy
2nd of the French National Road Race Championships
3rd of Paris-La Flèche

1910

Coppa Val d'Olona
3rd of the Giro della Romagna

1911

5th of 1911 Milan–San Remo
