= List of cyclists in the 1907 Tour de France =

Not all cyclists were competing for the victory in the 1907 Tour de France, some only joined as tourists. The most notable of them was Henri Pépin. Pépin had hired two riders, Jean Dargassies and Henri Gauban to ride with him. They treated the race as a pleasure ride, stopping for lunch when they chose and spending the night in the best hotels they could find. Dargassies and Gaubin became the first cyclists in the history of the Tour de France to ride not for their own placings but for their team leader's interest. During the race, they found another Tour de France competitor, Jean-Marie Teychenne, lying in a ditch. They helped him get up, fed him, and from that moment Teycheime was also helping Pépin.

As in the previous years, there were two classes of cyclists, the coureurs de vitesse and the coureurs sur machines poinçonnées. Of the 93 cyclists starting the race, 82 were in the poinçonnée category, which meant that they had to finish the race on the same bicycle as they left, and if it was broken they had to fix it without assistance. The coureurs de vitesse could get help from the car with bicycle repairmen when they had to fix a bicycle, and when a bicycle was beyond repair, they could change it to a new one.

Although the riders officially rode the Tour as individuals, some had the same sponsor and cooperated as if they rode in teams. At the start of the race, it was clear that the riders sponsored by Alcyon and the riders sponsored by Peugeot would compete for the overall victory. Alcyon started with three main contenders: Louis Trousselier, Marcel Cadolle and Léon Georget; Peugeot counted on Emile Georget.

== By starting number ==
Legend
No.	Starting number worn by the rider during the Tour
Pos.	Position in the general classification
DNF	Denotes a rider who did not finish

No.	Name	Nationality	Pos.	Ref
1	Édouard Wattelier	France	DNF	
2	Augustin Ringeval	France	8	
3	Lucien Pothier	France	DNF	
4	François Faber	Luxembourg	7	
5	Constant Ménager	France	DNF	
6	Alfred Faure	France	DNF	
7	Gaston Tuvache	France	16	
8	Albert Chartier	France	33	
9	Prosper Rau	France	DNF	
10	Marcel Cadolle	France	DNF	
11	Louis Trousselier	France	DNF	
12	Lucien Mazan	France	1	
13	Henri Lignon	France	DNF	
14	Marcel Lequatre	Switzerland	DNF	
16	Albert Baudet	France	25	
17	Noël Prevost	France	DNF	
18	Ferdinand Payan	France	10	
19	Armand Roume	France	DNF	
22	Jean-Baptiste Roux	France	18	
23	Paul Adeh	France	DNF	
24	Marcel Dozol	France	32	
25	Marcel Lallement	France	DNF	
26	Fernand Vercher	France	DNF	
27	Gabriel Mathonat	France	DNF	
28	Léon Riche	France	DNF	
29	Georges Fleury	France	12	
30	Georges Bronchard	France	21	
31	Henri Timmermann	Belgium	20	
32	David Dupont	France	DNF	
34	Henri Gauban	France	DNF	
35	Gaston Angeli	France	DNF	
36	Louis Lavalette	France	DNF	
37	Jules Chabas	France	DNF	
38	Louis Gardent	France	DNF	
39	Louis Lorillon	France	28	
40	Carlo Galetti	Italy	DNF	
42	Luigi Ganna	Italy	DNF	
43	Eberardo Pavesi	Italy	6	
44	Léon Aumonier	France	DNF	
45	Cyrille van Hauwaert	Belgium	DNF	
46	Alzir Vivier	France	15	
47	François Poiry	France	DNF	
48	Marceau Narcy	France	22	
49	Joseph Ponthieu	France	DNF	
50	Georges Landrieux	France	DNF	
52	Martin Soulie	France	DNF	
53	Honoré Genin	France	23	
54	Claude Cursillat	France	DNF	
55	Charles Crupelandt	France	DNF	
56	André Sevestre	France	DNF	
57	Alfred Le Bars	France	26	
58	Jacques Mendes	France	DNF	
59	Henri Pépin	France	DNF	
61	Marius Vilette	France	14	
62	Eloi Guichard	France	DNF	
63	Julien Maitron	France	DNF	
64	Arsène Tuale	France	DNF	
65	Alfred Quenon	France	27	
66	Jean Dargassies	France	DNF	
67	Henri Anthoine	France	DNF	
68	Léon Georget	France	DNF	
70	Georges Passerieu	France	4	
71	Gustave Garrigou	France	2	
72	Henri Cornet	France	DNF	
73	Émile Georget	France	3	
76	Jean-Michel Teychenne	France	DNF	
78	Georges Jeanblanc	France	DNF	
79	Jean Vezie	France	DNF	
80	Georges Devilly	France	DNF	
81	Charles Jeanperin	France	DNF	
82	Auguste Dufour	France	DNF	
83	Octave Noel	France	30	
84	François Lafourcade	France	13	
86	Pierre Privat	France	11	
87	François Beaugendre	France	5	
88	Philippe Pautrat	France	19	
89	Aloïs Catteau	Belgium	9	
90	Marcel Lecuyer	France	DNF	
92	Julien Gabory	France	DNF	
93	Ernest Ricaux	France	DNF	
94	Marcel Godivier	France	DNF	
95	Jules Bertholat	France	DNF	
97	Christophe Laurent	France	DNF	
98	Joseph Rouaix	France	DNF	
99	Eugène Delhaye	Belgium	17	
100	Anselme Mazan	France	DNF	
101	Henri Star	France	DNF	
103	Raymond Etcheverry	France	DNF	
104	Albert Geraud	France	31	
105	Antony Wattelier	France	24	
106	Anton Jaeck	Switzerland	DNF	
108	Pierre Desvages	France	DNF	
109	René Fleury	France	29	
