= 1907 Tour de France, Stage 8 to Stage 14 =

Cycling race stages

Route of the 1907 Tour de France

The 1907 Tour de France was the 5th edition of Tour de France, one of cycling's Grand Tours. The Tour began in Paris on 8 July and Stage 8 occurred on 22 July with a flat stage from Nîmes. The race finished in Paris on 4 August.

== Stage 8 ==
22 July 1907 — Nîmes to Toulouse, 303 km (188.3 mi)

Stage 8 result

Rank	Rider	Time
1	Émile Georget (FRA)	11h 02' 00"
2	Gustave Garrigou (FRA)	s.t.
3	Georges Passerieu (FRA)	s.t.
4	Lucien Mazan (FRA)	+ 13' 40"
5	François Beaugendre (FRA)	+ 19' 00"
6	Louis Trousselier (FRA)	+ 19' 25"
7	Léon Georget (FRA)	+ 32' 00"
8	François Faber (LUX)	+ 36' 00"
9	Cyrille van Hauwaert (BEL)	s.t.
10	Eberardo Pavesi (ITA)	s.t.

General classification after stage 8

Rank	Rider	Points
1	Émile Georget (FRA)	13
2	Louis Trousselier (FRA)	29
3	Lucien Mazan (FRA)	36
4		
5		
6		
7		
8		
9		
10		

== Stage 9 ==
24 July 1907 — Toulouse to Bayonne, 299 km (185.8 mi)

Stage 9 result

Rank	Rider	Time
1	Lucien Mazan (FRA)	10h 18' 00"
2	Georges Passerieu (FRA)	+ 23' 00"
3	Gustave Garrigou (FRA)	s.t.
4	Émile Georget (FRA)	Relegated
5	Henri Lignon (FRA)	+ 29' 00"
6	François Beaugendre (FRA)	+ 31' 00"
7	Aloïs Catteau (BEL)	+ 31' 05"
8	Fernand Vercher (FRA)	+ 38' 00"
9	Christophe Laurent (FRA)	+ 52' 00"
10	Eberardo Pavesi (ITA)	+ 55' 00"

General classification after stage 9

Rank	Rider	Points
1	Émile Georget (FRA)	17.5
2	Lucien Mazan (FRA)	37
3	Louis Trousselier (FRA)	40.5
4		
5		
6		
7		
8		
9		
10		

== Stage 10 ==
26 July 1907 — Bayonne to Bordeaux, 269 km (167 mi)

Stage 10 result

Rank	Rider	Time
1	Gustave Garrigou (FRA)	8h 07' 50"
2	Lucien Mazan (FRA)	s.t.
3	Émile Georget (FRA)	s.t.
4	Georges Passerieu (FRA)	+ 8' 12"
5	Ernest Ricaux (FRA)	+ 8' 14"
6	Eberardo Pavesi (ITA)	+ 32' 10"
7	François Faber (LUX)	+ 45' 10"
8	François Beaugendre (FRA)	s.t.
9	Ferdinand Payan (FRA)	s.t.
10	Augustin Ringeval (FRA)	s.t.

General classification after stage 10

Rank	Rider	Points
1	Lucien Mazan (FRA)	39
2	Gustave Garrigou (FRA)	54
3	Émile Georget (FRA)	64.5
4		
5		
6		
7		
8		
9		
10		

== Stage 11 ==
28 July 1907 — Bordeaux to Nantes, 391 km (243 mi)

Stage 11 result

Rank	Rider	Time
1	Lucien Mazan (FRA)	14h 33' 21"
2	Georges Passerieu (FRA)	+ 1"
3	Gustave Garrigou (FRA)	+ 50' 02"
4	Émile Georget (FRA)	+ 50' 12"
5	Augustin Ringeval (FRA)	s.t.
6	Ferdinand Payan (FRA)	+ 50' 13"
7	Pierre Privat (FRA)	+ 57' 25"
8	Aloïs Catteau (BEL)	+ 1h 03' 10"
9	François Faber (LUX)	+ 1h 04' 09"
10	Eberardo Pavesi (ITA)	+ 1h 04' 12"

General classification after stage 11

Rank	Rider	Points
1	Lucien Mazan (FRA)	40
2	Gustave Garrigou (FRA)	57
3	Émile Georget (FRA)	68.5
4		
5		
6		
7		
8		
9		
10		

== Stage 12 ==
30 July 1907 — Nantes to Brest, 321 km (199 mi)

Stage 12 result

Rank	Rider	Time
1	Gustave Garrigou (FRA)	12h 23' 00"
2	Lucien Mazan (FRA)	s.t.
3	Émile Georget (FRA)	s.t.
4	Georges Passerieu (FRA)	+ 9' 00"
5	François Beaugendre (FRA)	+ 21' 00"
6	Pierre Privat (FRA)	+ 1h 06' 00"
7	Eberardo Pavesi (ITA)	+ 1h 07' 00"
8	Ferdinand Payan (FRA)	s.t.
9	Honoré Genin (FRA)	s.t.
10	Augustin Ringeval (FRA)	+ 1h 16' 00"

General classification after stage 12

Rank	Rider	Points
1	Lucien Mazan (FRA)	42
2	Gustave Garrigou (FRA)	58
3	Émile Georget (FRA)	71.5
4		
5		
6		
7		
8		
9		
10		

== Stage 13 ==
1 August 1907 — Brest to Caen, 415 km (258 mi)

Stage 13 result

Rank	Rider	Time
1	Émile Georget (FRA)	16h 13' 30"
2	Lucien Mazan (FRA)	+ 1"
3	Gustave Garrigou (FRA)	+ 11' 00"
4	Georges Passerieu (FRA)	+ 1h 05' 30"
5	Pierre Privat (FRA)	s.t.
6	Eberardo Pavesi (ITA)	+ 1h 13' 15"
7	François Beaugendre (FRA)	+ 1h 24' 30"
8	Aloïs Catteau (BEL)	s.t.
9	René Fleury (FRA)	+ 2h 07' 30"
10	Ferdinand Payan (FRA)	s.t.

General classification after stage 13

Rank	Rider	Points
1	Lucien Mazan (FRA)	44
2	Gustave Garrigou (FRA)	61
3	Émile Georget (FRA)	72.5
4		
5		
6		
7		
8		
9		
10		

== Stage 14 ==
4 August 1907 — Caen to Paris, 251 km (156 mi)

Stage 14 result

Rank	Rider	Time
1	Georges Passerieu (FRA)	8h 44' 51"
2	Émile Georget (FRA)	s.t.
3	Lucien Mazan (FRA)	+ 3' 45"
4	Augustin Ringeval (FRA)	+ 9' 01"
5	Gustave Garrigou (FRA)	+ 19' 13"
6	François Beaugendre (FRA)	+ 26' 06"
7	Eberardo Pavesi (ITA)	+ 39' 15"
8	Gaston Tuvache (FRA)	+ 41' 54"
9	Alzir Vivier (FRA)	+ 55' 55"
10	Ferdinand Payan (FRA)	+ 56' 04"

General classification after stage 14

Rank	Rider	Points
1	Lucien Mazan (FRA)	47
2	Gustave Garrigou (FRA)	66
3	Émile Georget (FRA)	74
4	Georges Passerieu (FRA)	85
5	François Beaugendre (FRA)	123
6	Eberardo Pavesi (ITA)	150
7	François Faber (LUX)	156
8	Augustin Ringeval (FRA)	184
9	Aloïs Catteau (BEL)	196
10	Ferdinand Payan (FRA)	227
