= Marcel Lécuyer =

French cyclist

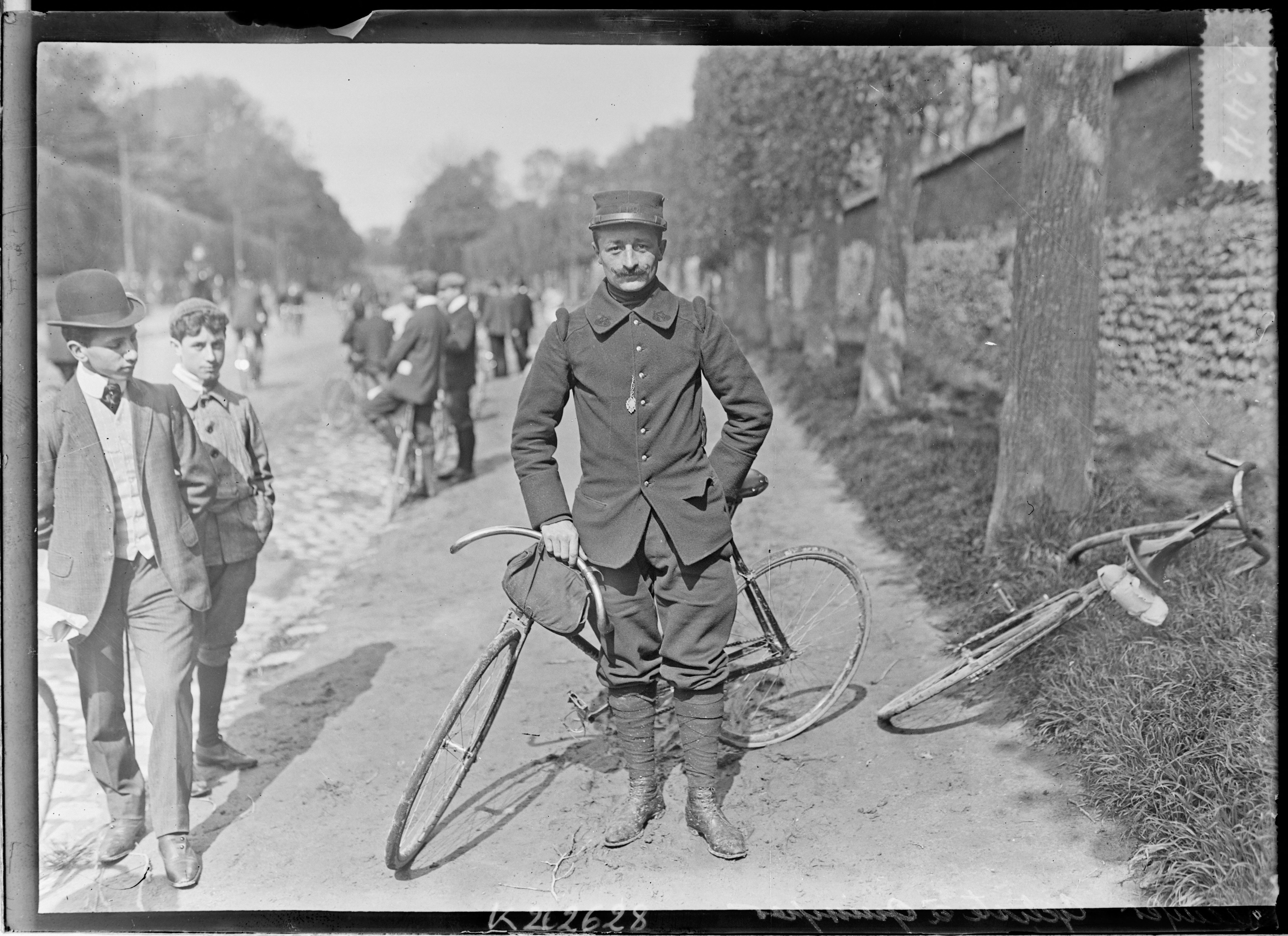
- Lécuyer in 1907

Personal information
- Born: Quimper, France

Cycling career
- Sport: Cycling
- Disciplines: Road; Track
- Role: Rider

Professional teams
- 1905-1906: Indivudual
- 1907: Peugeot-Wolber

Marcel Lécuyer was a French track and road cyclist.

Born in Quimper, Lécuyer started as an amateur road cyclist in the early 1900s. In 1904 he won the silver medal at the French National Road Race Championships in Lyon. He had another second place in Versailles-Houdan-Versailles behind Marcel Cadolle. At the track the next year he won the silver medal at the 1905 French National Stayers Championships behind Paul Guignard on 21 August. He became professional with Peugeot-Wolber in 1907. With the team he rode among others the 1907 Tour de France where he had a top-10 finish in stage 7.

== Major results ==
1904
2nd Versailles-Houdan-Versailles
(silver) French National Road Race Championships

1905
(silver) French National Stayers Championships

1907
10th 1907 Tour de France, stage 7
