= 1907 Tour de France, Stage 1 to Stage 7 =

Cycling race stages

Route of the 1907 Tour de France

The 1907 Tour de France was the 5th edition of Tour de France, one of cycling's Grand Tours. The Tour began in Paris on 8 July and Stage 7 occurred on 20 July with a flat stage to Nîmes. The race finished in Paris on 4 August.

The edition had a total of 4,488 km raced at an average sped of 28.470 km/hr. The participants included 93 starters out of which 33 were classified finishers. The 1907 Tour used points to calculate the General Classification. Émile Georget was leading when he received a large points pentalty for an illegal bicycle change. Lucien Petit-Breton was the 1907 Tour's overall winner.

== Stage 1 ==
8 July 1907 — Paris to Roubaix, 272 km (169.0 mi)

Stage 1 result and general classification after stage 1

Rank	Rider	Time
1	Louis Trousselier (FRA)	8h 49' 30"
2	Marcel Cadolle (FRA)	+ 3' 30"
3	Léon Georget (FRA)	s.t.
4	Lucien Mazan (FRA)	+ 7' 00"
5	Georges Passerieu (FRA)	+ 24' 30"
6	Émile Georget (FRA)	s.t.
7	François Beaugendre (FRA)	s.t.
8	Henri Cornet (FRA)	+ 31' 30"
9	Constant Ménager (FRA)	s.t.
10	Georges Landrieu (FRA)	+ 32' 30"

== Stage 2 ==
10 July 1907 — Roubaix to Metz, 398 km (247.3 mi)

Stage 2 result

Rank	Rider	Time
1	Émile Georget (FRA)	13h 39' 15"
2	Louis Trousselier (FRA)	s.t.
3	Lucien Mazan (FRA)	s.t.
4	Marcel Cadolle (FRA)	+ 29' 05"
5	Henri Cornet (FRA)	s.t.
6	Constant Ménager (FRA)	+ 29' 45"
7	Georges Passerieu (FRA)	+ 40' 45"
8	Gustave Garrigou (FRA)	s.t.
9	François Faber (LUX)	s.t.
10	François Beaugendre (FRA)	+ 54' 55"

General classification after stage 2

Rank	Rider	Points
1	Louis Trousselier (FRA)	3
2	Marcel Cadolle (FRA)	6
3	Émile Georget (FRA)	7
4		
5		
6		
7		
8		
9		
10		

== Stage 3 ==
12 July 1907 — Metz to Belfort, 259 km (161 mi)

Stage 3 result

Rank	Rider	Time
1	Émile Georget (FRA)	7h 46' 18"
2	Henri Lignon (FRA)	+ 3' 12"
3	François Faber (LUX)	+ 3' 57"
4	Gustave Garrigou (FRA)	+ 4' 02"
5	Marcel Cadolle (FRA)	+ 4' 42"
6	Louis Trousselier (FRA)	+ 11' 32"
7	Léon Georget (FRA)	+ 14' 17"
8	Julien Maitron (FRA)	+ 17' 19"
9	Lucien Mazan (FRA)	+ 17' 52"
10	Georges Passerieu (FRA)	s.t.

General classification after stage 3

Rank	Rider	Points
1	Émile Georget (FRA)	8
2	Louis Trousselier (FRA)	9
3	Marcel Cadolle (FRA)	11
4		
5		
6		
7		
8		
9		
10		

== Stage 4 ==
14 July 1907 — Belfort to Lyon, 309 km (192 mi)

Stage 4 result

Rank	Rider	Time
1	Marcel Cadolle (FRA)	9h 27' 02"
2	Émile Georget (FRA)	+ 1"
3	Luigi Ganna (ITA)	s.t.
4	François Beaugendre (FRA)	s.t.
5	Louis Trousselier (FRA)	+ 3' 32"
6	François Faber (LUX)	+ 17' 16"
7	Carlo Galetti (ITA)	+ 21' 43"
8	Gustave Garrigou (FRA)	+ 21' 58"
9	Lucien Mazan (FRA)	s.t.
10	Marcel Godivier (FRA)	+ 38' 06"

General classification after stage 4

Rank	Rider	Points
1	Émile Georget (FRA)	10
2	Marcel Cadolle (FRA)	12
3	Louis Trousselier (FRA)	13
4		
5		
6		
7		
8		
9		
10		

== Stage 5 ==
16 July 1907 — Lyon to Grenoble, 311 km (193 mi)

Stage 5 result

Rank	Rider	Time
1	Émile Georget (FRA)	11h 17' 00"
2	François Faber (LUX)	+ 7' 00"
3	Luigi Ganna (ITA)	+ 14' 05"
4	Carlo Galetti (ITA)	+ 15' 00"
5	Eberardo Pavesi (ITA)	s.t.
6	Marcel Cadolle (FRA)	+ 18' 37"
7	Cyrille van Hauwaert (BEL)	+ 24' 40"
8	Gustave Garrigou (FRA)	+ 24' 45"
9	Louis Trousselier (FRA)	+ 27' 00"
10	Lucien Mazan (FRA)	+ 27' 50"

General classification after stage 5

Rank	Rider	Points
1	Émile Georget (FRA)	11
2	Marcel Cadolle (FRA)	18
3	Louis Trousselier (FRA)	22
4		
5		
6		
7		
8		
9		
10		

== Stage 6 ==
18 July 1907 — Grenoble to Nice, 345 km (214 mi)

Stage 6 result

Rank	Rider	Time
1	Georges Passerieu (FRA)	12h 14' 00"
2	Émile Georget (FRA)	s.t.
3	Lucien Mazan (FRA)	+ 10' 00"
4	Louis Trousselier (FRA)	+ 20' 00"
5	Marcel Cadolle (FRA)	+ 27' 00"
6	Léon Georget (FRA)	s.t.
7	Ernest Ricaux (FRA)	+ 1h 06' 00"
8	Cyrille van Hauwaert (BEL)	s.t.
9	Marcel Godivier (FRA)	+ 1h 47' 30"
10	Georges Landrieu (FRA)	s.t.

General classification after stage 6

Rank	Rider	Points
1	Émile Georget (FRA)	13
2	Marcel Cadolle (FRA)	23
3	Louis Trousselier (FRA)	26
4		
5		
6		
7		
8		
9		
10		

== Stage 7 ==
20 July 1907 — Nice to Nîmes, 345 km (214 mi)

Stage 7 result

Rank	Rider	Time
1	Émile Georget (FRA)	12h 36' 00"
2	Lucien Mazan (FRA)	s.t.
3	Louis Trousselier (FRA)	+ 38' 00"
4	Gustave Garrigou (FRA)	s.t.
5	Georges Passerieu (FRA)	+ 38' 40"
6	Henri Lignon (FRA)	+ 38' 50"
7	Augustin Ringeval (FRA)	+ 38' 52"
8	Léon Georget (FRA)	+ 1h 59' 00"
9	Cyrille van Hauwaert (BEL)	s.t.
10	Marcel Lecuyer (FRA)	s.t.

General classification after stage 7

Rank	Rider	Points
1	Émile Georget (FRA)	14
2	Louis Trousselier (FRA)	29
3	Lucien Mazan (FRA)	31
4		
5		
6		
7		
8		
9		
10		
