= Marceau Narcy =

French cyclist (1889–1914)

Personal information
- Full name: Agricol Marceau Narcy
- Born: 31 March 1889 Briare, France
- Died: 11 September 1914 (aged 25) Romagne-sous-Montfaucon, France

Cycling career
- Sport: Cycling
- Discipline: Road
- Role: Rider

Professional teams
- 1906: Individual
- 1907: Biguet–Soly
- 1908–1909: Alcyon–Dunlop
- 1910: Individual
- 1913: Individual

Agricol Marceau Narcy (31 March 1889 – 11 September 1914) was a French road racing cyclist who competed professionally between 1906 and 1910. He finished two times 22nd in the Tour de France and had top-10 finished in multiple cycling monuments. He was killed during the opening months of the World War I.

== Biography ==
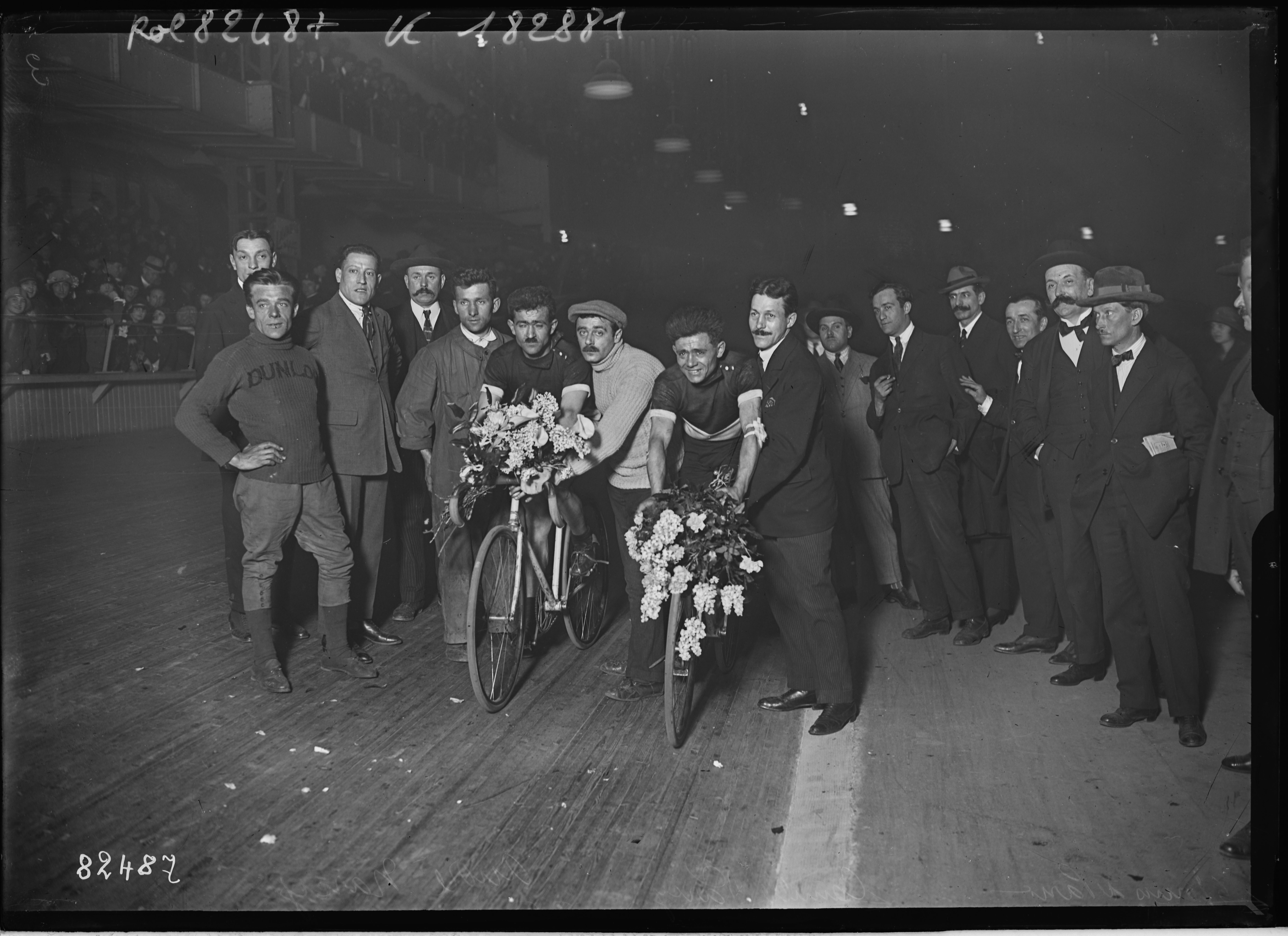
His brothers Camille (right) and André (left)

Narcy was born on 31 March 1889 in Briare, France. He came from a prominent cycling family from Bourges. Together with his three brothers: Ferdinand, Camille and André Narcy, he was among the leading riders at the Tivoli Velodrome in Bourges. The Narcy family was also well known locally for its involvement in the motorcycle trade, operating a dealership that sold Peugeot motorcycles.

Narcy was a member of the Union Sportive de Montargis and competed as a professional road cyclist between 1906 and 1910. Among his best results were an eighth-place finish in 1906 Paris–Roubaix. At the time he was just 17 years and 14 days old, and hold the record for the youngjesf rider during the earliest era of the race. Another top-10 finish he had in a cycling monument was a seventh place in 1909 Paris–Tours. He rode the 1907 Tour de France and 1908 Tour de France. He completed both editions and finished 22nd overall in the general classification both years. During the 1908 and 1909 seasons he rode for the Alcyon–Dunlop team alongside riders including François Faber, Gustave Garrigou, Eugène Christophe, Louis Trousselier and Cyrille Van Hauwaert. He rode a sky-blue Alcyon bicycle.

After his professional cycling career, Narcy worked as a dealer in bicycles, motorcycles, and sewing machines. He initially established his business in La Charité-sur-Loire before relocating to Bourges, where he sold Alcyon and Windsor bicycles. Although no longer a professional, he continued to compete as an independent rider. He still recorded an eight place in 1913 Paris–Calais and 9th in the stage race 1913 Paris–Honfleur with a second place in stage 1.

Following the outbreak of World War I, Narcy served in the French Army. He was captured by German forces and died from his wounds during the opening months the War on 11 September 1914 at the military hospital in Romagne-sous-Montfaucon at the age of 25. He was initially buried by the German Army at Romagne before his remains were later reinterred in the military cemetery at Brieulles-sur-Meuse. His death was legally confirmed by a judgment of the Bourges Tribunal on 11 March 1920. The judgment was subsequently entered into the civil registers of Bourges on 26 March 1926.

=== General classification results timeline ===
Grand Tour general classification results
Grand Tour	1906	1907	1908	1909	1910
Tour de France	—	22	22	—	—
Major one-day race results
Monument	1906	1907	1908	1909	1910
Paris–Roubaix	8	—	—	—	20
Paris–Tours	20	—	—	7	—
