= Marius Villette =

French cyclist (1886–1916)

Personal information
- Full name: Marius Julien Villette
- Born: 16 October 1886 Salon-de-Provence, France
- Died: 11 October 1916 (aged 29) Bouchavesnes-Bergen, France

Cycling career
- Sport: Cycling
- Discipline: Road
- Role: Rider

Professional team
- 1907–1911: Individual

Marius Julien Villette (16 October 1886 – 11 October 1916) was a French road racing cyclist who competed professionally between 1907 and 1911 and continued afterwards. He completed two times in the Tour de France, finishing 14th overall in the 1907 Tour de France and had multiple podium finishes in major cycle races.

== Biography ==
Villette was born on 16 October 1886 in Salon-de-Provence, Bouches-du-Rhône, France.

Villette competed as a professional road cyclist between 1907 and 1911. He rode an Automoto bicycle. During this period he participated in two editions of the Tour de France, in the 1907 edition and 1911 edition. His best performance came in his debut, when he finished 14th overall in the general classification and finished 25th overall in 1911.

Although no longer a professional after 1911, Villette continued racing until World War I started in 1914. He still recorded podium finishes, among others the third place in the 1913 Nice–Annot–Nice (Grand Circuit du Sud-Est) and the second place in 1912 Marseille–Lyon.

Following the outbreak of World War I, Villette served as a corporal in the French Army with the 31st Infantry Regiment. He was killed in action during Battle of Gallipoli in the Battle of the Somme at Bouchavesnes-Bergen on 11 October 1916, five days before his 30th birthday.

During the first world war centennial, in the summer of 2014, Villette was remembered among other cyclists who died in World War I.
