= Fernand Vercher =

French cyclist (1886-1948)

Personal information
- Born: 27 January 1886 Châtellerault, France
- Died: 27 July 1948 (aged 62)
- Height: 1.64 m (5 ft 5 in)

Cycling career
- Sport: Cycling
- Discipline: Road
- Role: Rider

Professional team
- 1907: Alcyon-Dunlop

Fernand Vercher (27 January 1886 – 27 July 1948) was a French road cyclist.

His most successful year was 1907 riding for the professional team Alcyon-Dunlop. That year he finished seventh in the main international cycling classic Bordeaux–Paris and eight in a 1907 Tour de France stage. He also competed in other main cycling classics, including the 1906 Paris–Tours and 1911 Paris–Tours.

In his hometown Châtellerault a cycling path is named after him called Piste Fernand Vercher.
