= Eugène Delhaye =

Belgian cyclist

Personal information
- Born: 16 February 1876 La Louvière, Belgium

Cycling career
- Sport: Cycling
- Discipline: Road
- Role: Rider

Professional teams
- 1904: Drugenand–Le Lion
- 1906–1907: Individual

Eugène Delhaye (born 16 February 1876) was a Belgian road cyclist who competed professionally between 1904 and 1907.

== Biography ==
Delhaye was born in La Louvière, Belgium, on 16 February 1876. He rode professionally for the Drugenand–Le Lion team in 1904 before competing as an independent rider during the 1906 and 1907 seasons.

He competed in the 1904 Tour de France, the second edition of the Tour de France, completing all five stages and finished 22nd overall. However, together with 28 cyclists he was disqualified. The reasons for the disqualification were never made public, becoming known as one of the earliest Tour mysteries.

That year he finished just next to the podium at the 1904 Belgian National Road Race Championships and won the bronze medal at the Province of Brabant Championships behind national champion Jules Sales. He also competed at the main cycling monuments and recorded one top-10 finish in the 1906 Paris–Tours.

Delhaye participated again on the in the Tour de France in the 1907 edition. He completed the tour in 17h place, even a better general classification position than 1904.

== Major results ==
1904
(bronze) Province of Brabant Championships
4th Belgian National Road Championships
~~22nd overall 1904 Tour de France~~

1906
10th Paris–Tours

1907
6th Paris–Hesdin

=== Grand Tour and Classic results timeline ===
Race	1904	1906	1907
Tour de France	~~22~~	—	17
Paris–Roubaix	27	—	—
Paris–Tours	Not held	10	—
National Championships (road race)	4	—	—
