= Automoto =

Former motorcycle manufacturer

- Industry: Manufacture of motorcycles vehicle construction
- Founded: 1899 in Saint-Étienne
- Fate: Merged in 1930, brand ended in 1962
- Successor: Peugeot
- Headquarters: Doubs, France
- Products: Motorcycles Bicycles

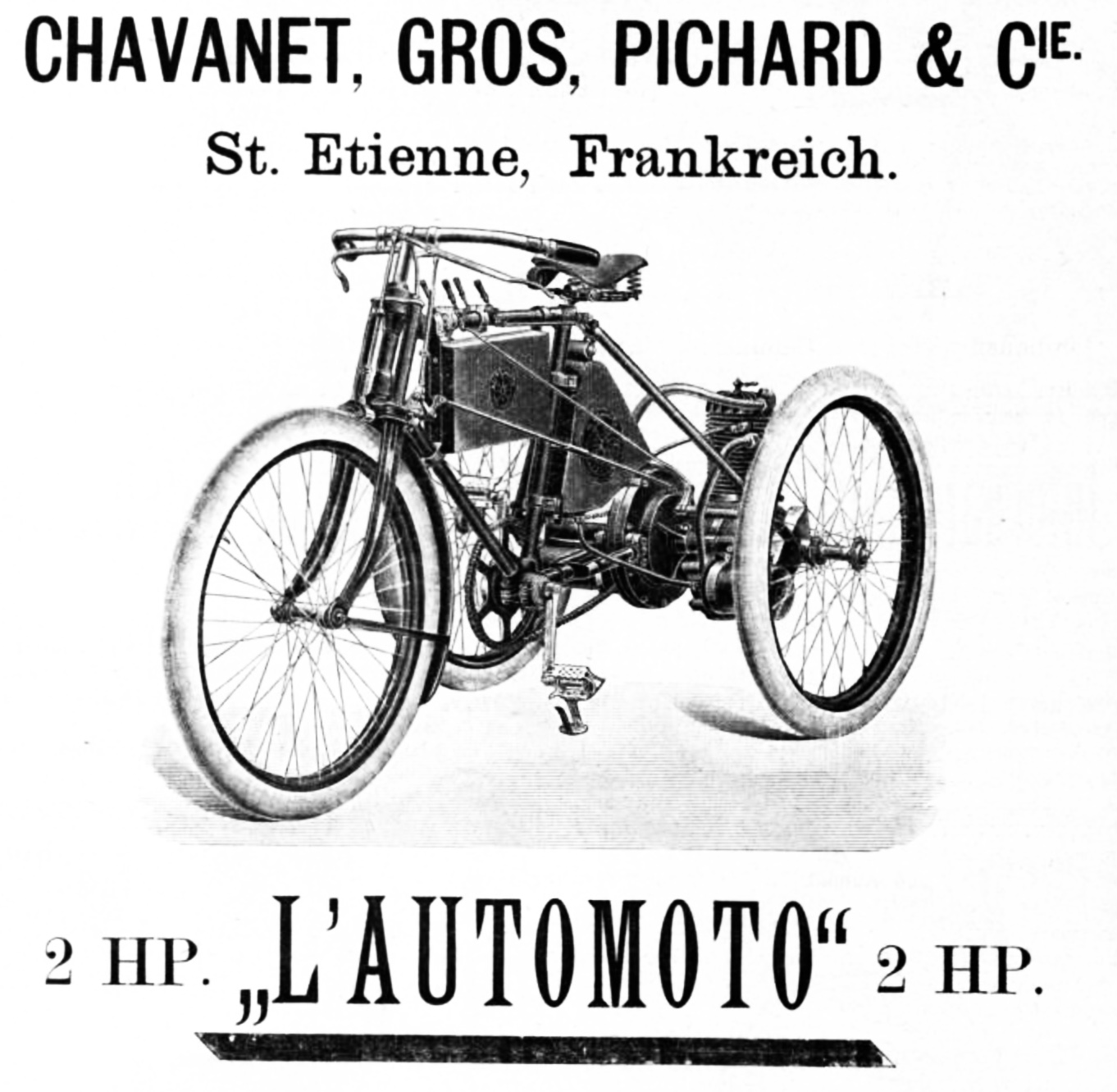
Automoto (1899)

Automoto was a French bicycle and motorcycle manufacturer founded in 1899, which joined with the Peugeot group in 1930 and was fully absorbed by 1962. Prior to World War II, Automoto sourced engines from Chaise, Zurcher, J.A.P., and Villiers. Engines produced by Ateliers de Mécanique du Centre (AMC) were also used after 1945.

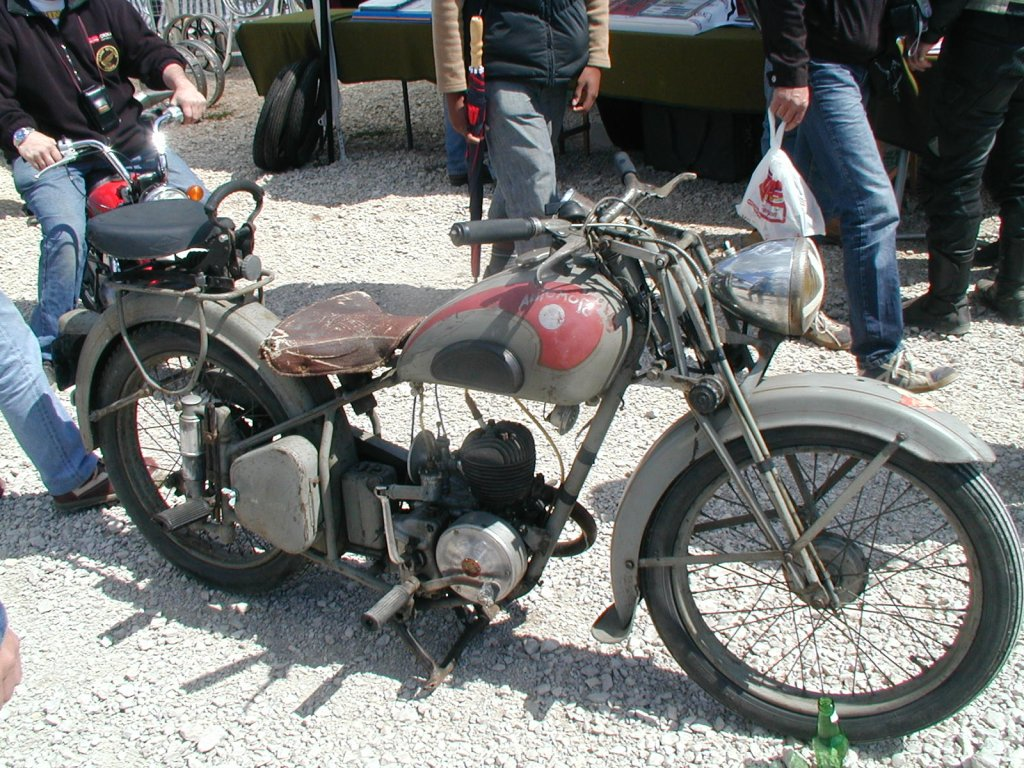

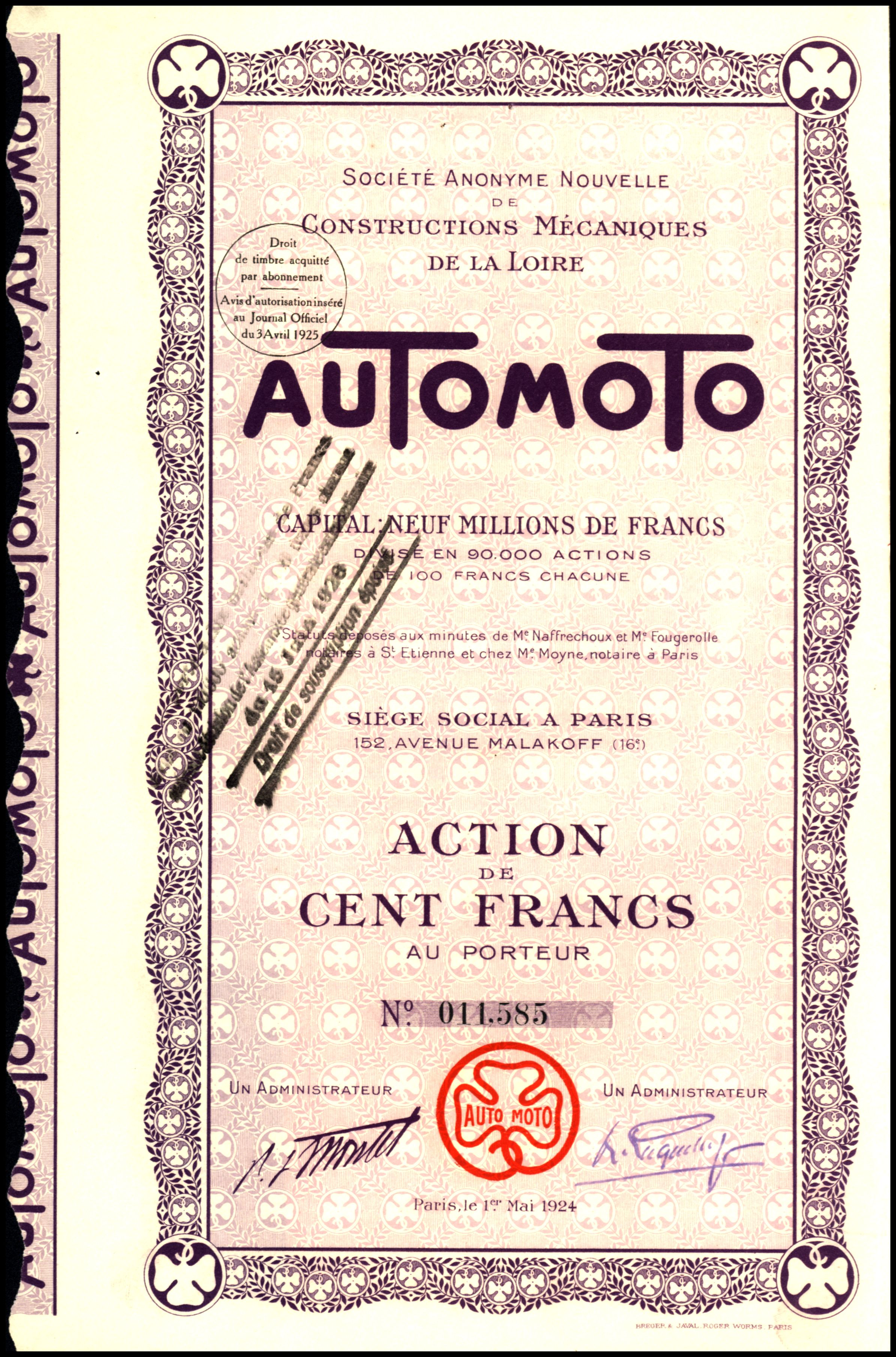
Share of AUTOMOTO, issued 1. May 1924
