= René Fleury =

French cyclist (1889–1975)

Personal information
- Born: 24 May 1889 Caen, France
- Died: 23 January 1975 (aged 85) Saint-Léger-les-Mélèzes, France
- Height: 167 cm (5 ft 6 in)

Cycling career
- Sport: Cycling
- Discipline: Road
- Role: Rider

Professional teams
- 1907: Étoile Sportive Caennaise
- 1908: Labor
- 1909: Le Globe
- 1909: Valor

René Fleury (24 May 1889 – 23 January 1975) was a French professional road cyclist. He competed in three editions of the Tour de France, finishing 29th in the 1907 Tour de France.

== Career ==
Born in Caen, Fleury took part in the 1907 Tour de France, where he finished 29th overall. During the 1909 Tour de France, he was forced to abandon the race in the 12th stage from Nantes to Brest after a crash in which he fractured his shoulder. His participation in the 1907 Tour, alongside Albert Geraux, marked one of the earliest appearances by riders from the Calvados region in the Tour.

During World War I, Fleury was mobilized with the 104th Infantry Regiment. He was seriously wounded by shell fragments on 15 March 1915 near Perthes-lès-Hurlus.

== Honors ==
- Officer of the Legion of Honour (1952)
- Military Medal (1935)
- Croix de guerre 1914–1918
- 1914–1918 Inter-Allied Victory medal (1936)

== Major results ==
1905
4th Paris–Caen
1906
3rd Paris–Caen
1907
1st Circuit de l'Eure (ahead of Paul Duboc)
1908
1st Circuit de Caen
4th Tourouvre–Alençon (behind François Beaugendre, Trousselier, and Paul Duboc)
1909
2nd Caen–Cherbourg–Caen

=== Grand Tour general classification results ===
Race	1907	1908	1909
Tour de France	29th	DNF (Stage 4)	DNF (Stage 12)
