= 1909 Paris–Tours =

Race details
- Dates: 26 September 1909
- Stages: 1
- Distance: 248 km (154 mi)
- Winning time: 8h 05' 00"

Results
	Winner	François Faber (LUX)
	Second	Jean Alavoine (FRA)
	Third	Ernest Paul (FRA)

The 1909 Paris–Tours was the sixth edition of the Paris–Tours cycle race and was held on 26 September 1909. The race started in Paris and finished in Tours. The race was won by François Faber.

== General classification ==
Final general classification

Rank	Rider	Time
1	François Faber (LUX)	8h 05' 00"
2	Jean Alavoine (FRA)	+ 3 lengths
3	Ernest Paul (FRA)	+ 11' 00"
4	Francois Verstraeten (BEL)	+ 20' 00"
5	Jean Bouillet (FRA)	+ 20' 00"
6	Henri Cornet (FRA)	+ 23' 00"
7	Marceau Narcy (FRA)	+ 23' 00"
8	Louis Fevre (FRA)	+ 23' 00"
9	Camille Desliens (FRA)	+ 45' 00"
10	Gaston Loizeau (FRA)	+ 45' 00"
