= Ernest Ricaux =

French cyclist (1886–1972)

Personal information
- Born: 31 October 1886 Paris, France
- Died: 11 August 1972 (aged 85)

Cycling career
- Sport: Cycling
- Discipline: Road
- Role: Rider

Professional teams
- 1906: Peugeot
- 1907–1908: Peugeot–Wolber
- 1909: Nil–Supra
- 1911: Automoto–Persan

Ernest Ricaux (31 October 1886 – 11 August 1972) was a French professional road cyclist. He competed professionally between 1906 and 1911. During his career he had multiple top-10 finishes at cycling classics including fifth at the 1906 Paris–Tours. He rode four editions of the Tour de France and finished 26th overall in the 1911 Tour de France.

== Biography ==
Ricaux was born in 1886 in the 17th arrondissement of Paris. He turned professional in 1906 with Peugeot Cycling Team and remained with Peugeot–Wolber in 1907 and 1908. In his first years he finished fifth at the main international Cycling Classic 1906 Paris–Tours. He made his Tour de France debut in the 1906 Tour de France. The next year at the 1907 Tour de France he finished in two stages fifth and seventh. That year he also had a podium finish in Paris–Dieppe and recorded a ninth place in the French National Road Race Championships.

He later rode with Nil–Supra (1909) including at the 1909 Tour de France. In 1911, riding with Automoto–Persan he finished 26th overall at the 1909 Tour de France. He had that year again a top 10 achievement in 1909 Paris–Tours.

== Major results ==
1906
5th Paris–Tours

1907
3rd Paris–Dieppe
9th French National Road Race Championships

1911
10th Paris–Tours

=== Grand Tour and Classic results timeline ===
Race	1906	1907	1909	1911
Tour de France	DNS (Stage 3)	DNF (Stage 11)	DNF (Stage 3)	26
Paris–Tours	5	—	—	10
