= Henri Gauban =

French cyclist

Personal information
- Full name: Jean Gauban
- Born: 11 September 1874 Muret, France
- Died: 10 February 1958 (aged 83) Muret, France

Cycling career
- Sport: Cycling
- Disciplines: Road; Track
- Role: Rider

Jean “Henri” Gauban, (11 September 1874 – 10 February 1958) was a French track and road racing cyclist. He is most known for participating in several editions of the Tour de France, including the inaugural 1903 Tour.

He was the father of cyclist Henri Gauban (1899–1989).

In 1906, he was disqualified for taking a train along with three other riders. Even in his 60s, he made headlines again by sneaking into a stage of the Tour de France that passed near his home, before being stopped by police motorcyclists.

In the 1907 Tour de France, he was a teammate of Henri Pépin and played an important role.

In track cycling he rode as teammates with Achille Germain, winning the second prize at the Six Days of Toulouse.

In 1952 he was awarded the gold Medal for Youth, Sports and Community Involvement Go

== Main results ==
=== Track cycling ===
- 1906
  - 2nd in Six Days of Toulouse (with Achille Germain)

=== Road cycling ===
- 1902
  - 2nd: Toulouse–Luchon–Toulouse
- 1903
  - 3rd: Toulouse–Luchon–Toulouse
- 1904
  - 1904 Tour de France
    - 5th: stage 1

==== General classification results timeline ====
Grand Tour general classification results
Year	1903	1904	1905	1906	1907
Tour de France	DNF (Stage 2)	DNF (Stage 2)	DNF (Stage 1)	DSQ (Stage 3)	DNF (Stage 11)

== Honors ==
- (1952) — Gold Medal for Youth, Sports and Community Involvement
