= Alcyon =

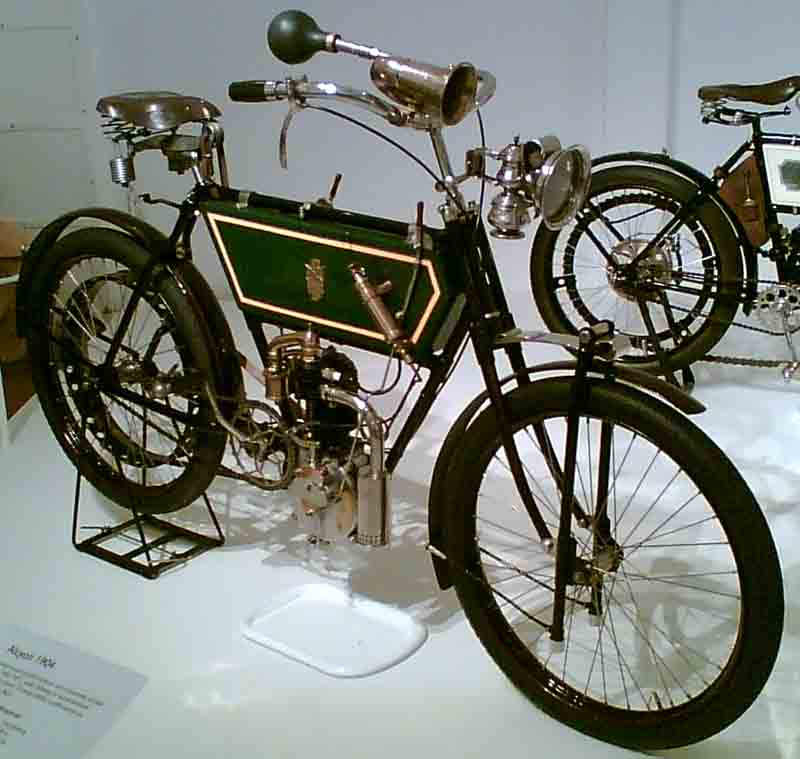
An Alcyon bicycle constructed in 1904

The Alcyon was a French bicycle, automobile, and motorcycle manufacturer between 1903 and 1954.

== Origins ==
Alcyon originated from about 1890 when Edmond Gentil started the manufacture of bicycles in Neuilly, Seine. In 1902, this was complemented by motorcycle production and in 1906, the first cars were shown at the "Salon de l'Automobile" in Paris, France. Also in 1906 it founded the professional Alcyon cycling team which was active until 1955, including winning the Tour de France 6 times.

== Motorcycle racing ==
In 1912 Alcyon competed at the Isle of Man TT races with a 348cc single-cylinder engine featuring two inlet valves and two exhaust valves. Both bikes failed to finish the Junior TT race.

Alcyon had local success in France during the 1920s, with riders such as Marc Jolly, Marcel Mourrier, Jean Durand and Lucien Lemasson winning races. During this time too, this bicycle brand got its nickname "l'intrépide Alcyon".

== Voiturettes before the World War I ==
Two models were shown in 1906, one a two-seat light car with single-cylinder 950 cc engine and a larger four seat model with 1.4-litre four-cylinder engine. Both engines were bought in from Gentil. The cars were advanced models with 3-speed gearboxes and shaft drive. However, the single-cylinder models were dropped in 1912 and larger models of up to 2120 cc were added to the range. By then, most of the engines were obtained from Zurcher.

The company moved to Courbevoie, Seine in 1912.

In 1954 Peugeot absorbed Alcyon.

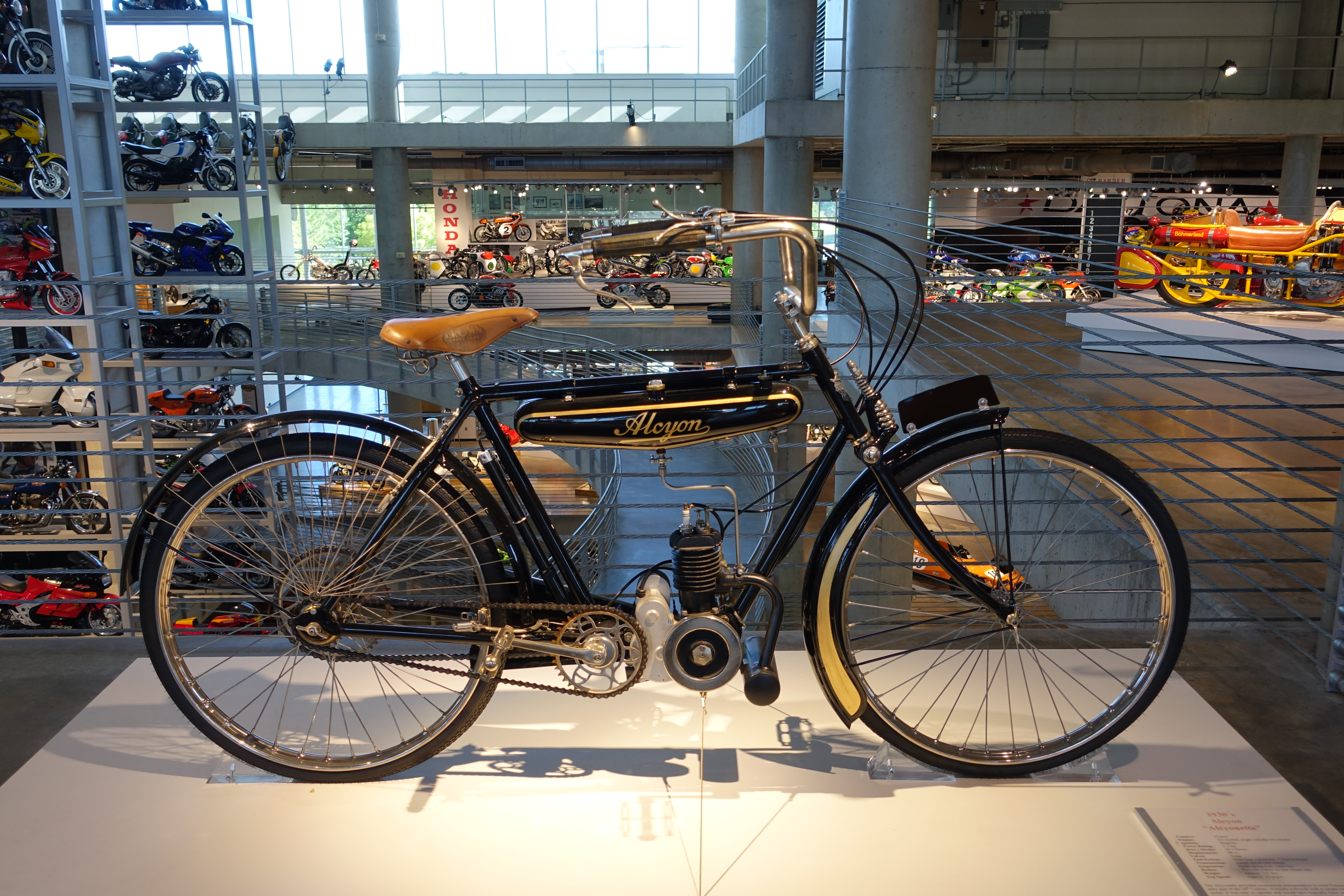
1930s Alcon "Alcyonette" 98cc motorcycle on display at the Barber Vintage Motorsports Museum, Birmingham, Alabama.

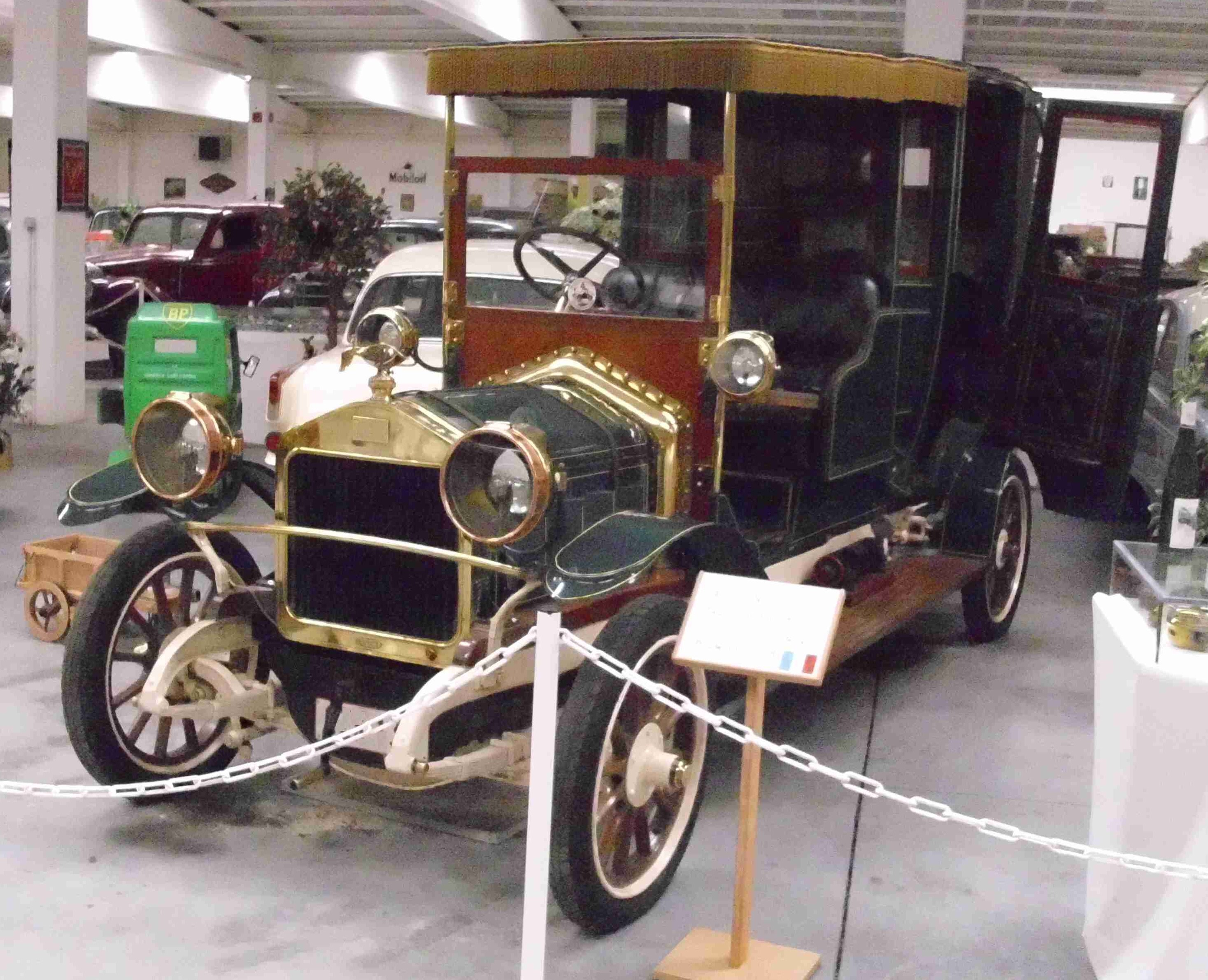
An Alcyon from 1908

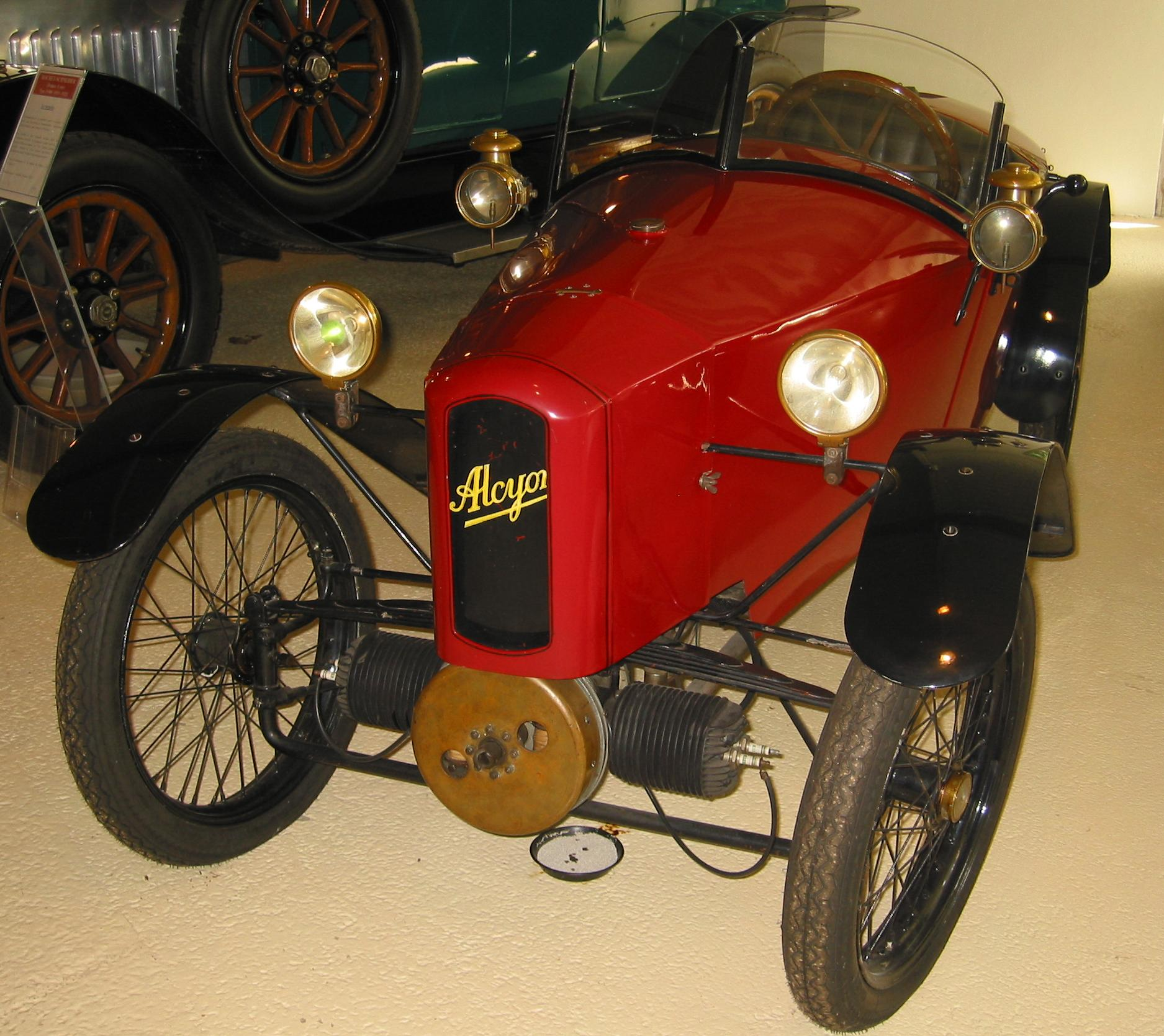
An Alcyon from 1921

== Cyclecars between wars ==
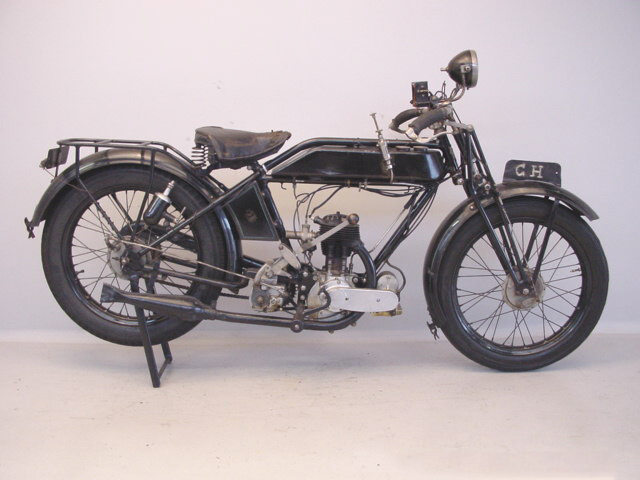
A 1925 Alcyon Touriste 350 JAP motorcycle

In 1914, the company's name was changed to Automobiles Alcyon. The first post-war model, released in 1921, was the 1914 cc four-cylinder model, some examples of which were tuned and sold by the Lyons agent, M. Giroux, as Alycon-GL (Giroux Lyons) and performed quite well in competition. However, the car was not a success and did not sell well, so in 1923, Alcyon moved into the production of cyclecars, using 500 cc two-stroke flat-twin engines in a design bought from SIMA-Violet. By 1929 Alcyon realised that the cyclecar era was over, and discontinued car production.

== Trophée Gentil (1946-1963) ==
In 1946, the "Gentil Trophy" was created in memory of the founder of Cycles Alcyon, who died that year. It was awarded for the "achievement of the year", and took the form of a work of art created by Carlo Sarrabezolles. Each National Federation expressed its choice and the winner had to obtain 70% of the votes to obtain this honorary title.

=== List of winners ===
- 1946: (Belgium) Émile Masson
- 1947: (Italy) Fausto Coppi
- 1948: (Belgium) Briek Schotte
- 1949: (United Kingdom) Reginald Harris
- 1950: (Switzerland) Ferdi Kübler & Hugo Koblet
- 1951: Prize not awarded
- 1952: (Italy) Fausto Coppi
- 1953: (France) Jacques Anquetil
- 1954: (France) Louison Bobet
- 1955: (Belgium) Stan Ockers
- 1956: (Italy) Ercole Baldini
- 1957: (France) Roger Rivière
- 1958: (Luxembourg) Charly Gaul
- 1959: (Belgium) Rik Van Looy
- 1960: (France) Jacques Anquetil
- 1961: (France) Jean Jourden, Henri Belena & Jacques Gestraut
- 1962: (Netherlands) Jo de Roo
- 1963: (France) Jacques Anquetil

The company also gave its name to a race, the Grand critérium Alcyon, open to independent and aspiring riders under U.V.F. regulations.

== See also ==
- Alcyon (cycling team)
