= Albert Chartier (cyclist) =

French cyclist

Personal information
- Full name: Albert Chartier
- Born: 20 March 1888
- Died: Unknown

Cycling career
- Sport: Cycling
- Role: Rider

Albert Chartier (born 20 March 1888) was a French racing cyclist. He finished in last place in the 1907 Tour de France.
