= SIMA-Violet =

Sima Violet (Société Industrielle de Matériel Automobile)
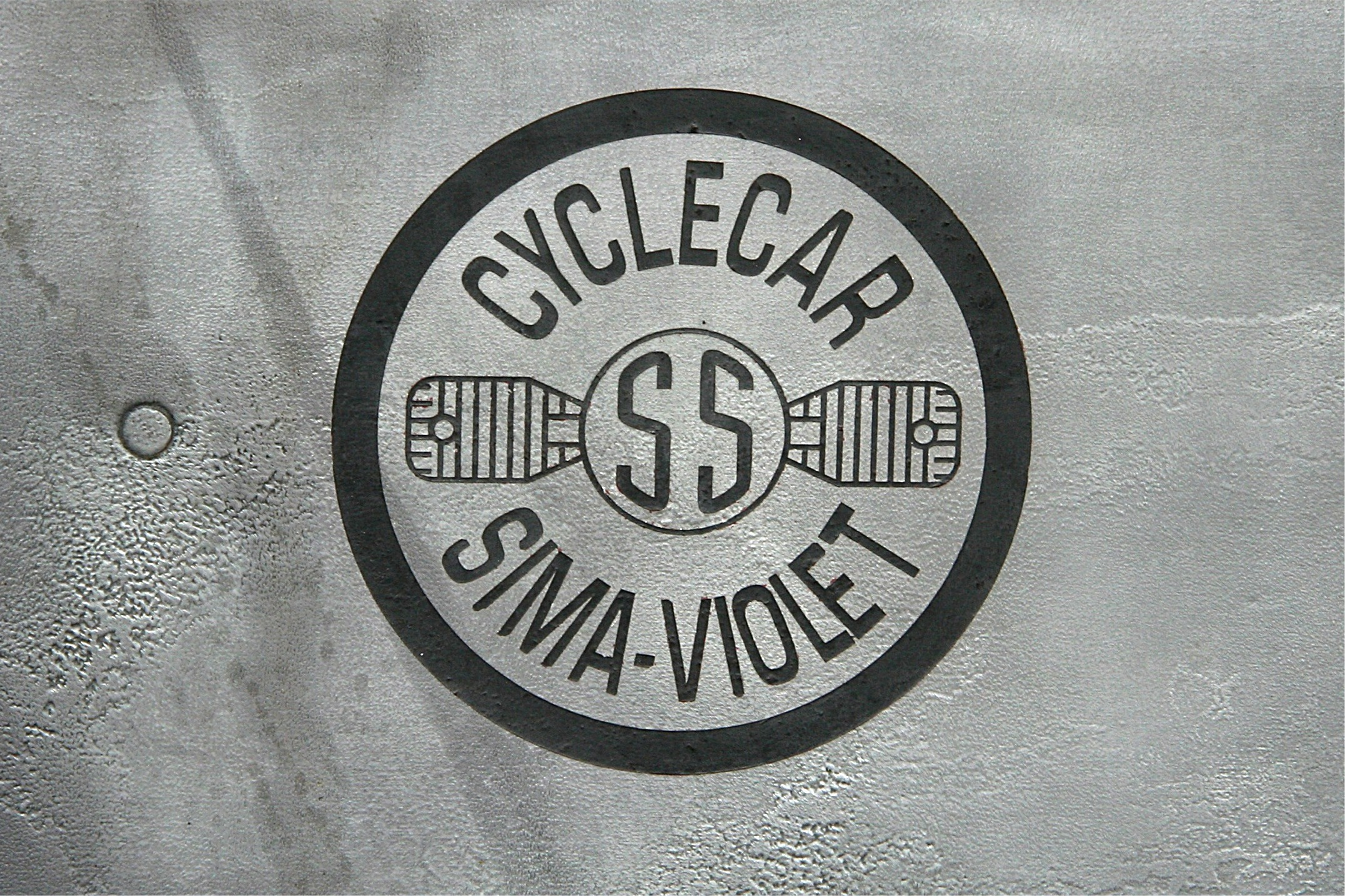

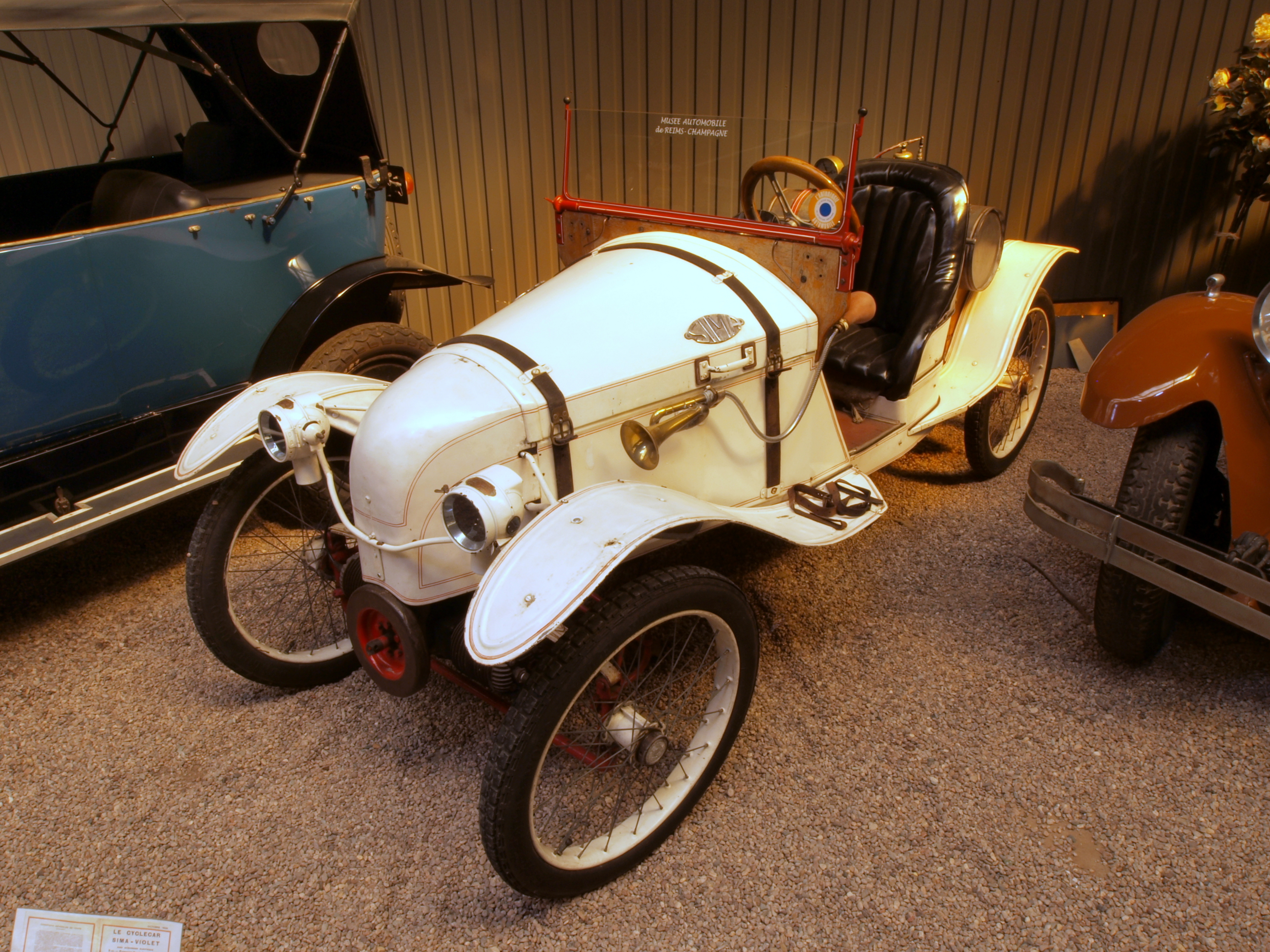
- Founded: 1924
- Defunct: 1929
- Headquarters: Courbevoie, France
- Key people: Marcel Violet
- Products: Automobiles

Sima Violet was a French manufacturer of cyclecars between 1924 and 1929.

== The name ==
Sima was an acronym, the letters standing for "Société Industrielle de Matériel Automobile". Violet respected the creator of the cars, Marcel Violet.

== The business ==
The company was founded at Courbevoie on the northwestern side of Paris, in a part of the city which was already home to numerous automobile manufacturers and suppliers. Marcel Violet who created the little vehicle was a long-standing advocate of two-stroke air-cooled boxer-format engines, and these powered the cyclecars that carried his name Sima Violet ended production in 1929, to be succeeded at their Courbevoie site by the Sima-Standard business which survived till 1932.

== The cars ==
The only vehicle produced was a cyclecar, which was a four-wheeled vehicle lighter than a conventional passenger car, but with a two-stroke engine and light-weight construction reminiscent of a motor cycle. In the years following the First World War the French government used taxation policy to encourage cyclecars.

The Sima-Violet cyclecar was powered by a two-stroke twin-cylinder air-cooled engine of 497cc mounted in a low-slung position ahead of the driver. Power was delivered to the rear wheels via a two speed transmission mounted on the rear-axle. The quoted top speed for a standard vehicle was 110 km/h (68 mph). The Sima-Violet appeared at the Paris Motor Show in October 1924 at which time the only body-style listed was a steel-frame "Torpedo" type 2-seater, sitting on a 2,200 mm (86.6 in) wheelbase, and which the manufacturer was listing at a price of 4,950 francs. A single seater sports bodied version was also produced.

The front wheels were suspended using a transversely mounted leaf-spring, combined with "friction shock-absorbers". The brakes operated only on the rear wheels.

By the time of its final show appearance at the 22nd Paris Motor Show in October 1928 the car had acquired what appears to be a vertically mounted radiator at the front, but was still reportedly powered by a flat-twin motor-cycle style engine.

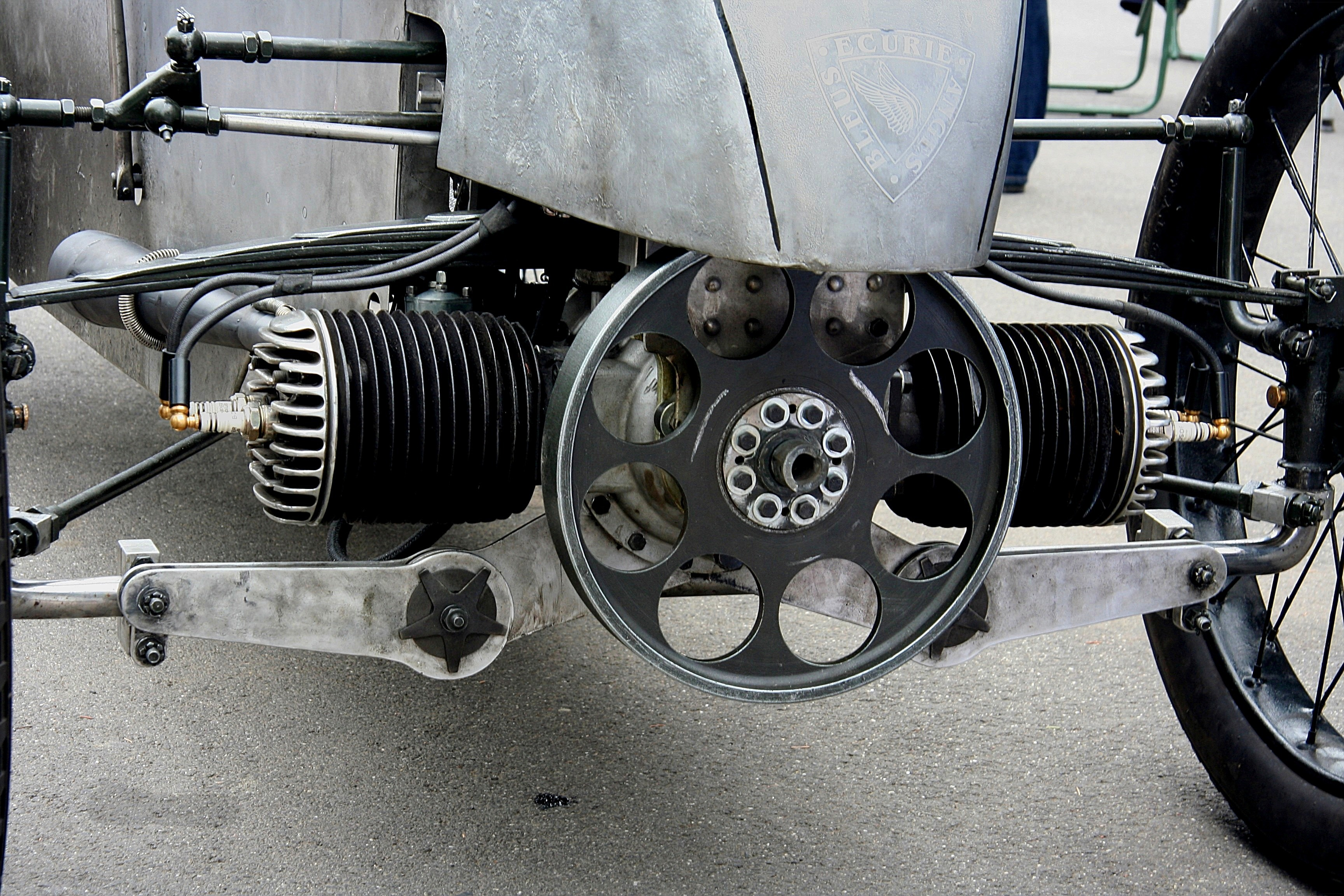
The twin-cylinder air-cooled boxer-format motor was mounted in a low slung position at the front of the vehicle.

== Reading list ==
- Harald Linz, Halwart Schrader: Die Internationale Automobil-Enzyklopädie. United Soft Media Verlag, München 2008, ISBN 978-3-8032-9876-8. (German)
- George Nick Georgano (Chefredakteur): The Beaulieu Encyclopedia of the Automobile. Volume 3: P–Z. Fitzroy Dearborn Publishers, Chicago 2001, ISBN 1-57958-293-1. (English)
- George Nick Georgano: Autos. Encyclopédie complète. 1885 à nos jours. Courtille, Paris 1975. (French)
