= Ferdinand Payan =

French cyclist

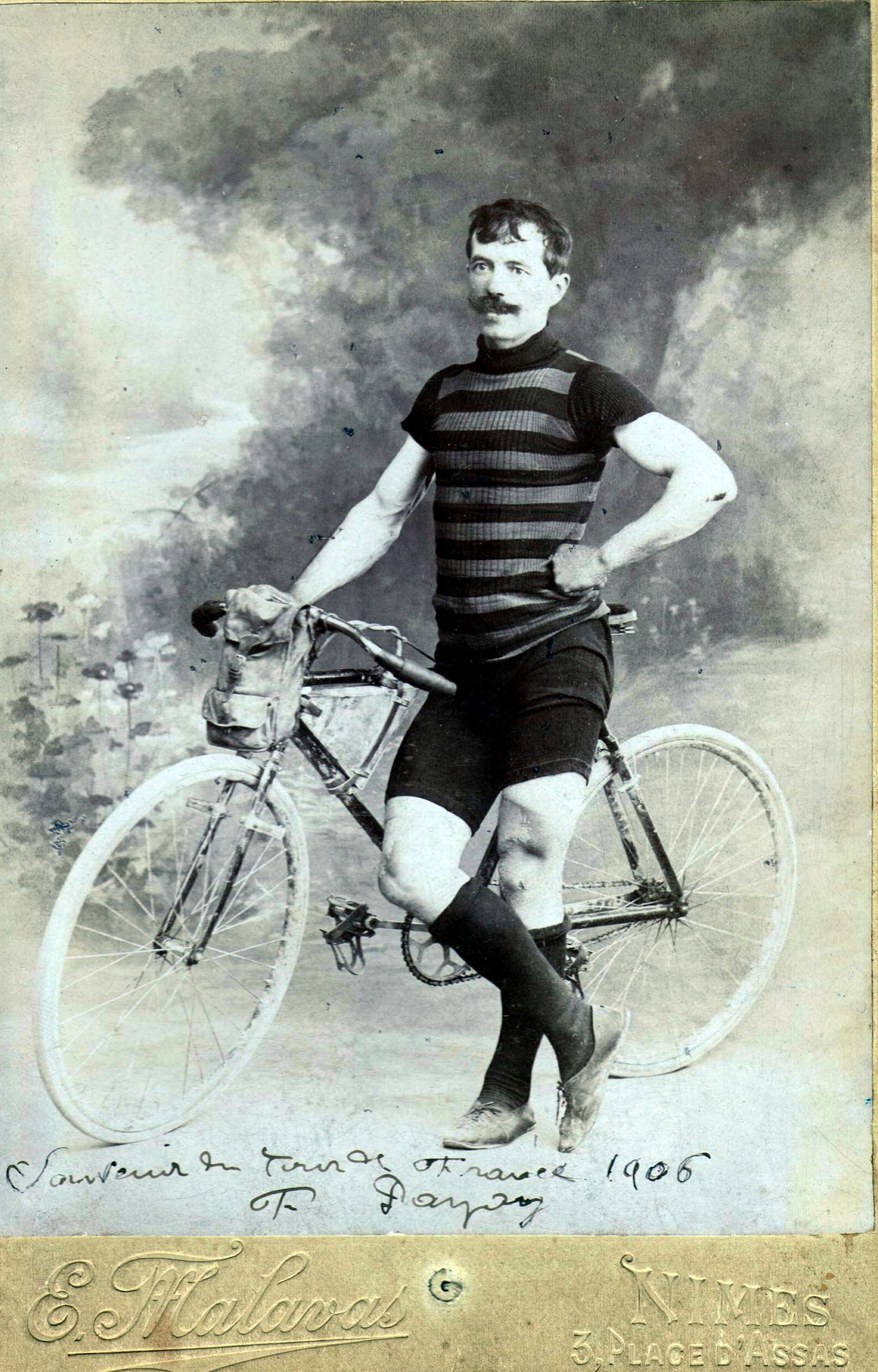

Personal information
- Full name: Ferdinand Payan
- Born: 21 April 1870 Arles, France
- Died: 17 May 1961 (aged 91) Nice, France

Cycling career
- Sport: Cycling
- Discipline: Road
- Role: Rider

Professional team
- 1903–1912: –

Ferdinand Payan (21 April 1870 – 17 May 1961) was a French bicyclist of the early 20th century. He was born in Arles in 1870.

He participated in the 1903 Tour de France, the first Tour, and came in 12th place. He was 19 hours, 9 minutes and 2 seconds behind the winner Maurice Garin.

He died in 1961 in Nice.

== Major competitions ==
- 1903 Tour de France – 12th place
- 1904 Tour de France – did not finish
- 1906 Tour de France – 12th place
- 1907 Tour de France – 10th place
- 1908 Tour de France – 24th place
- 1909 Tour de France – did not finish
- 1911 Tour de France – did not finish
- 1912 Tour de France – did not finish
