= Zürcher =

Zürcher is a Swiss or German surname. It is a habitational name for someone from the city of Zürich. Notable people with the surname include:

- Brigitte Zürcher, Swiss orienteer
- Christoph Zürcher, German professor
- Erik Zürcher (1928–2008), Dutch sinologist
- Erik-Jan Zürcher (born 1953), Dutch Turkologist
- Josephina Theresia Zürcher (1866–1932), Swiss surgeon and doctor
- Manuela Zürcher (born 1982), Swiss footballer
- Markus Zürcher (1946–2013), Swiss painter
- Neil Zurcher (1935–2025), American journalist and television host
- Robert Zürcher, Swiss canoeist

== See also ==
- Garrett Zuercher, American deaf actor
