= 1907 Tour de France =

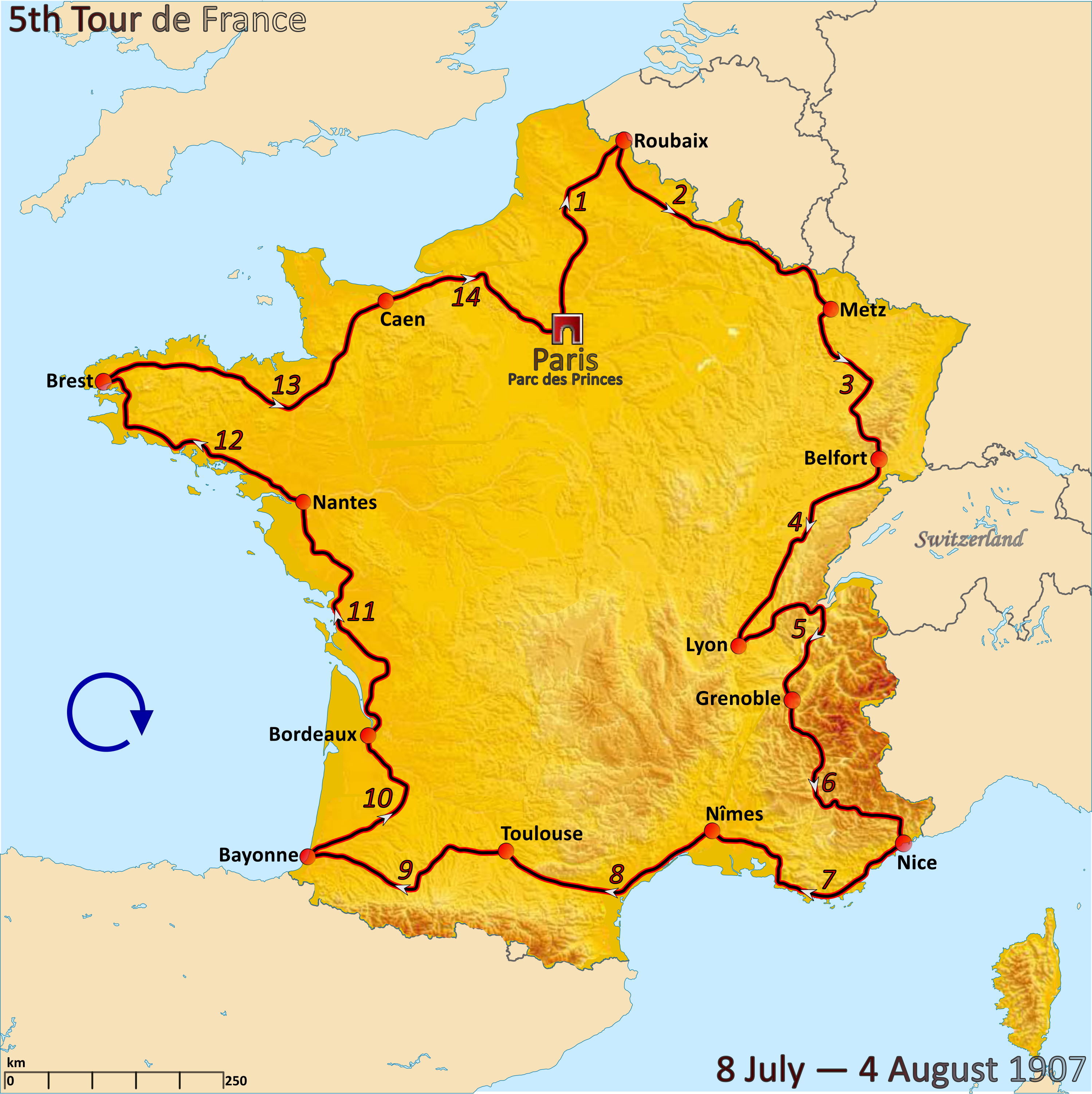
- Route of the 1907 Tour de France followed clockwise, starting in Paris

Race details
- Dates: 8 July – 4 August 1907
- Stages: 14
- Distance: 4,488 km (2,789 mi)
- Winning time: 47 points

Results
	Winner	Lucien Petit-Breton (FRA)
	Second	Gustave Garrigou (FRA)
	Third	Émile Georget (FRA)

The 1907 Tour de France was the fifth running of the annual Tour de France, one of cycling's Grand Tours. From 8 July to 4 August, the 93 cyclists cycled 4488 km (2,788 mi) in fourteen stages around France. The winner, Lucien Petit-Breton, completed the race at an average speed of 28.47 km/h (17.69 mph). For the first time, climbs in the Western Alps were included in the Tour de France. The race was dominated at the start by Émile Georget, who won five of the first eight stages. In the ninth stage, he borrowed a bicycle from a befriended rider after his own broke. This was against the rules; initially he received only a small penalty and his main competitors left the race out of protest. Georget's penalty was then increased and Lucien Petit-Breton became the new leader. Petit-Breton won two of the remaining stages and the overall victory of the Tour.

== Innovations and changes ==
The 1907 Tour de France incorporated 14 stages, which was one more than in 1906. For the first time, roads in Switzerland were included. The mountain stages in 1906 had been so successful, according to the organiser Henri Desgrange, that the western Alps were included in the race for the first time.

The 1907 race was also the first time that a car with bicycle repairmen drove behind the riders, to give assistance in solving mechanical problems on bicycles.

As in 1906, the race was decided by a points system. At the end of every stage, the winner was given one point, the next cyclist two points, and so on. After the eighth stage, when there were only 49 cyclists left in the race, the points given in the first eight stages were redistributed among the remaining cyclists, according to their positions in those stages.

== Participants ==
René Pottier, the winner of the 1906 Tour de France, did not defend his title because he had committed suicide in early 1907. Although the riders officially rode the Tour as individuals, some shared the same sponsor and cooperated as if they rode in teams. At the start of the race, it was expected that the riders sponsored by Alcyon and the riders sponsored by Peugeot would compete for the overall victory. Alcyon started with three main contenders: Louis Trousselier, Marcel Cadolle and Léon Georget; Peugeot counted on Emile Georget.

As in the previous years, there were two classes of cyclists, the coureurs de vitesse and the coureurs sur machines poinçonnées. Of the 93 cyclists starting the race, 82 were in the poinçonnée category, which meant that they had to finish the race on the same bicycle as they left, and if it was broken they had to fix it without assistance. The coureurs de vitesse could get help from the car with bicycle repairmen when they had to fix a bicycle, and when a bicycle was beyond repair, they could change it to a new one.

Not all cyclists were competing for the victory; some only joined as tourists. The most notable of them was Henri Pépin. Pépin had hired two riders, Jean Dargassies and Henri Gauban, to ride with him. They treated the race as a pleasure ride, stopping for lunch when they chose and spending the night in the best hotels they could find. Dargassies and Gaubin became the first cyclists in the history of the Tour de France to ride not for their own placings but for another rider's interest. During the race, they found another Tour de France competitor, Jean-Marie Teychenne, lying in a ditch. They helped him get up and fed him; from then on Teychenne also helped Pépin.

== Race overview ==
Early in the race, Trousselier, François Faber and Emile Georget were the main contenders. Trousselier, winner of the 1905 Tour de France and eager to win again, won the first stage. In the second stage, the Tour passed the French-German border to finish in Metz, which was then part of Germany. The German authorities allowed the cyclists to finish there, but did not allow the French flag to be flown or the cars of race officials to enter the city. At the end of the stage, Emile Georget seemingly beat Trousselier with a very small margin. After inquiry, Desgrange, the Tour's organiser, decided to put both cyclists in first place, to keep both sponsors satisfied.

In the third stage, the Tour returned to France; at the border, the riders were stopped by two French customs officers and the delay took so long that the stage had to be restarted. During the stage in the Alps, Émile Georget was better than his competitors; he won the stage and became leader of the general classification. Georget won five of the first eight stages, and had a commanding lead. In the seventh stage, Marcel Cadolle, at that time in second place, fell and his handlebar penetrated his knee, after which he had to give up.

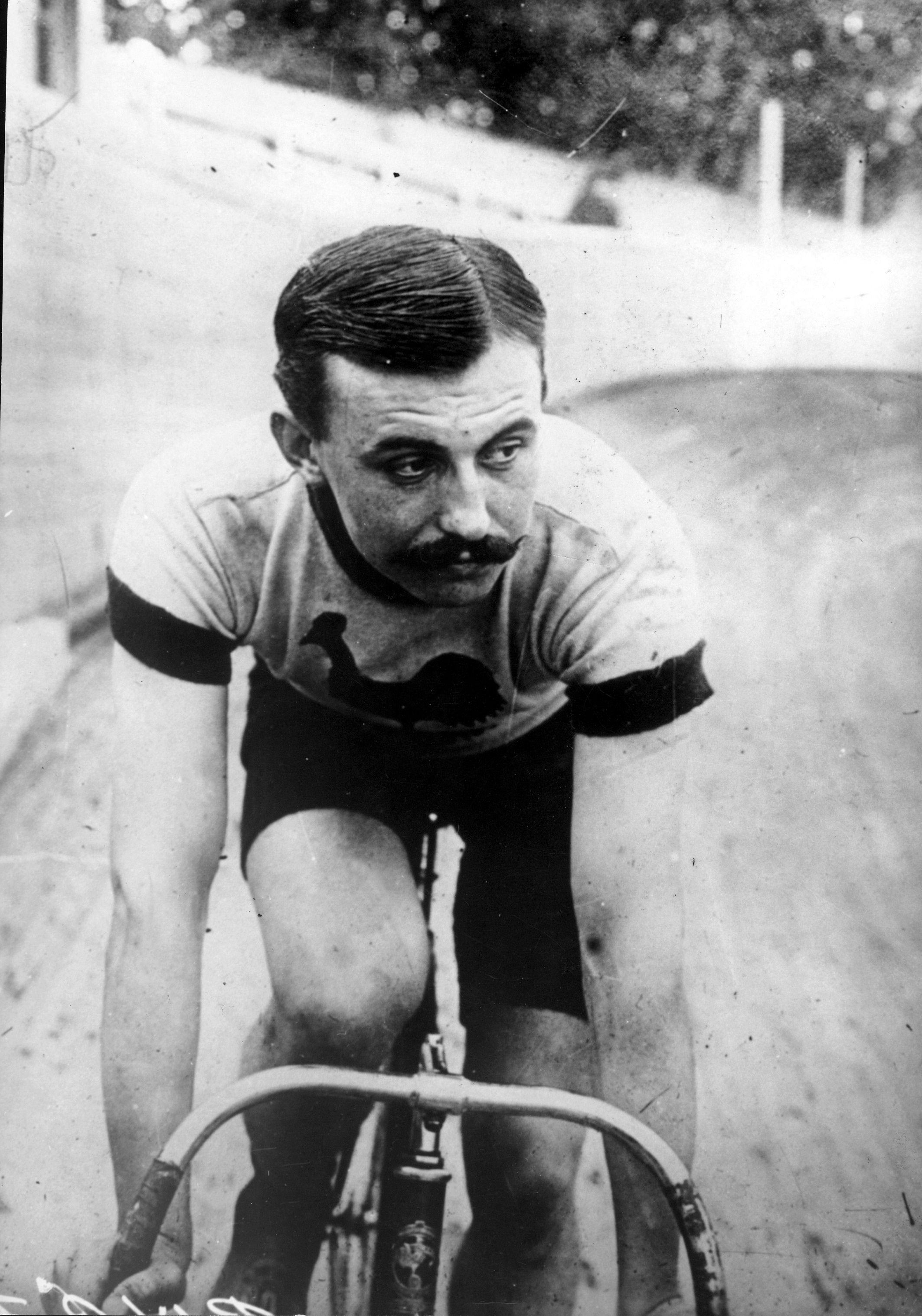
Lucien Petit-Breton, the winner of the 1907 Tour de France

During the ninth stage, when Georget was leading the race, he broke the frame of his bicycle at a checkpoint. According to the rules, Georget should have fixed his bicycle alone; he knew this would take him more than five hours, so he switched bicycles with Pierre-Gonzague Privat. This was against the rules, so Georget was given a fine of 500 francs. After this stage, won by Petit-Breton, the general classification was as follows:

General classification after stage 9
Rank	Rider	Points
1	Émile Georget	17
2	Lucien Petit-Breton	37
3	Louis Trousselier	40
4	Gustave Garrigou	53

Unsatisfied with the fine given to Georget, Trousselier and the other riders sponsored by Alcyon left the Tour in protest.

After the tenth stage, the organisers gave Georget an additional penalty for the bicycle change in the ninth stage. They changed the classification of the ninth stage, moving Georget from 4th on the stage to last (48th place). This effectively cost him 44 points in the general classification and moved him from first to third place. The new classification, after the tenth stage, was

General classification after stage 10
Rank	Rider	Points
1	Lucien Petit-Breton	39
2	Gustave Garrigou	54
3	Emile Georget	64

Lucien Petit-Breton became the new leader of the race. Although he had already finished in fifth place and fourth place in previous years, he was still relatively unknown, and had started in the coureurs sur machines poinçonnées category. Petit-Breton finished in the top three in the next stages, so no other cyclist was able to challenge him for the overall victory. At the end of the race, he had increased his lead to a margin of 19 points ahead of Garrigou and 27 points ahead of Georget.

== Results ==
=== Stage results ===
In the first and final stages, the cyclists were allowed to have pacers.

Stage characteristics and winners
Stage	Date	Course	Distance	Type (Note: In 1907, there was no distinction in the rules between plain stages and mountain stages; the icons shown here indicate which stages included mountains.)	Winner	Race leader
1	8 July	Paris to Roubaix	272 km (169 mi)	Plain stage	Louis Trousselier (FRA)	Louis Trousselier (FRA)
2	10 July	Roubaix to Metz	398 km (247 mi)	Plain stage	Emile Georget (FRA) (Note: At first, Georget was declared winner, but after investigation by tour organiser Henri Desgrange, Trousselier was also declared winner.); Louis Trousselier (FRA)	Louis Trousselier (FRA)
3	12 July	Metz to Belfort	259 km (161 mi)	Stage with mountain(s)	Emile Georget (FRA)	Emile Georget (FRA)
4	14 July	Belfort to Lyon	309 km (192 mi)	Stage with mountain(s)	Marcel Cadolle (FRA)	Emile Georget (FRA)
5	16 July	Lyon to Grenoble	311 km (193 mi)	Stage with mountain(s)	Emile Georget (FRA)	Emile Georget (FRA)
6	18 July	Grenoble to Nice	345 km (214 mi)	Stage with mountain(s)	Georges Passerieu (FRA)	Emile Georget (FRA)
7	20 July	Nice to Nîmes	345 km (214 mi)	Plain stage	Emile Georget (FRA)	Emile Georget (FRA)
8	22 July	Nîmes to Toulouse	303 km (188 mi)	Plain stage	Emile Georget (FRA)	Emile Georget (FRA)
9	24 July	Toulouse to Bayonne	299 km (186 mi)	Plain stage	Lucien Petit-Breton (FRA)	Emile Georget (FRA)
10	26 July	Bayonne to Bordeaux	269 km (167 mi)	Plain stage	Gustave Garrigou (FRA)	Lucien Petit-Breton (FRA)
11	28 July	Bordeaux to Nantes	391 km (243 mi)	Plain stage	Lucien Petit-Breton (FRA)	Lucien Petit-Breton (FRA)
12	30 July	Nantes to Brest	321 km (199 mi)	Plain stage	Gustave Garrigou (FRA)	Lucien Petit-Breton (FRA)
13	1 August	Brest to Caen	415 km (258 mi)	Plain stage	Emile Georget (FRA)	Lucien Petit-Breton (FRA)
14	4 August	Caen to Paris	251 km (156 mi)	Plain stage	Georges Passerieu (FRA)	Lucien Petit-Breton (FRA)
	Total		4,488 km (2,789 mi)			

=== General classification ===
Although 110 riders were on the starting list, 17 did not show up, so the race started with 93 cyclists. At the end of the Tour de France, 33 cyclists remained. The cyclists officially were not grouped in teams; some cyclists had the same sponsor, even though they were not allowed to work together.

Final general classification (1–10)
Rank	Rider	Sponsor	Points	Category
1	Lucien Petit-Breton (FRA)	Peugeot-Wolber	47	Poinçonnées
2	Gustave Garrigou (FRA)	Peugeot-Wolber	66	Vitesse
3	Emile Georget (FRA)	Peugeot-Wolber	74	Vitesse
4	Georges Passerieu (FRA)	Peugeot-Wolber	85	Vitesse
5	François Beaugendre (FRA)	Peugeot-Wolber	123	Poinçonnées
6	Eberardo Pavesi (ITA)	Otav	150	Poinçonnées
7	François Faber (LUX)	Labor-Dunlop	156	Poinçonnées
8	Augustin Ringeval (FRA)	Labor-Dunlop	184	Vitesse
9	Aloïs Catteau (BEL)	–	196	Poinçonnées
10	Ferdinand Payan (FRA)	–	227	Poinçonnées

Final general classification (11–33)
Rank	Rider	Sponsor	Points	Category
11	Pierre-Gonzague Privat (FRA)	–	251	Vitesse
12	Georges Fleury (FRA)	–	274	Poinçonnées
13	François Lafourcade (FRA)	Montabro	299	Poinçonnées
14	Marius Villette (FRA)	–	333	Poinçonnées
15	Alzir Vivier (FRA)	–	340	Poinçonnées
16	Gaston Tuvache (FRA)	–	348	Poinçonnées
17	Eugène Delhaye (BEL)	–	378	Poinçonnées
18	Baptiste Roux (FRA)	–	389	Vitesse
19	Philippe Pautrat (FRA)	–	393	Vitesse
20	Henri Timmermann (BEL)	–	411	Poinçonnées
21	Georges Bronchard (FRA)	–	414	Poinçonnées
22	Marceau Narcy (FRA)	Biguet-Soly	416	Poinçonnées
23	Honoré Genin (FRA)	Peugeot-Wolber	434	Vitesse
24	Antony Wattelier (FRA)	Labor-Dunlop/Montabro	436	Vitesse
25	Albert Baudet (FRA)	–	439	Poinçonnées
26	Alfred Le Bars (FRA)	Labor-Dunlop	479	Vitesse
27	Alfred Quenon (FRA)	–	487	Poinçonnées
28	Henri Lorillon (FRA)	Touiller	491	Vitesse
29	René Fleury (FRA)	–	495	Poinçonnées
30	Octave Noël (FRA)	Furor Cycles	505	Poinçonnées
31	Albert Géraud (FRA)	JC Cycles	515	Poinçonnées
32	Marcel Dozol (FRA)	–	522	Poinçonnées
33	Albert Chartier (FRA)	–	568	Poinçonnées

The total prize money was 25000 French francs, of which 4000 francs were given to Petit-Breton for winning the Tour. In total, he received more than 7000 francs.

=== Other classifications ===
Lucien Petit-Breton was also the winner of the "machines poinçonnées" category.

The organising newspaper l'Auto named Emile Georget the meilleur grimpeur. This unofficial title is the precursor to the modern-day mountains classification.

== Aftermath ==
Petit-Breton also started the 1908 Tour de France. He won five stages and the general classification, and became the first cyclist to win the Tour de France two times.

== Bibliography ==
- Amels, Wim (1984). De geschiedenis van de Tour de France 1903–1984 (in Dutch). Valkenswaard, Netherlands: Sport-Express. ISBN 978-90-70763-05-3.
- Augendre, Jacques (2016). "Guide historique" [Historical guide] (PDF). Tour de France (in French). Paris: Amaury Sport Organisation. Archived (PDF) from the original on 17 August 2016.
- Chany, Pierre; Cazeneuve, Thierry (1985). La Fabuleuse Histoire du Tour de France (in French). France: ODIL. ISBN 978-2-8307-0689-5.
- Cleijne, Jan (2014). Legends of the Tour. London: Head of Zeus. ISBN 978-1-78185-998-8.
- Dauncey, Hugh; Hare, Geoff (2003). The Tour de France, 1903–2003: A Century of Sporting Structures, Meanings and Values. London: Frank Cass & Co. ISBN 978-0-203-50241-9.
- Laget, Françoise; Montgermont, Gilles; Cazaban, Philippe; Laget, Serge (2013). Tour de France: The Official 100th Race Anniversary Edition. London: Hachette UK. ISBN 978-1-78206-415-2.
- McGann, Bill; McGann, Carol (2006). The Story of the Tour de France: 1903–1964. Vol. 1. Indianapolis, IN: Dog Ear Publishing. ISBN 978-1-59858-180-5.
- Thompson, Christopher S. (2006). The Tour de France: A Cultural History. Oakland, CA: University of California Press. ISBN 978-0-520-24760-4.
- Wheatcroft, Geoffrey (2007). Le Tour: A History of the Tour De France. New York City: Simon & Schuster. ISBN 978-1-84739-086-8.
