= Henri Timmermann =

Belgian cyclist

Personal information
- Born: 14 December 1874

Cycling career
- Sport: Cycling
- Role: Rider

Henri Timmermann (born 14 December 1874, date of death unknown) was a Belgian racing cyclist. He rode in the 1923 Tour de France.
