= Marcel Cadolle =

French cyclist

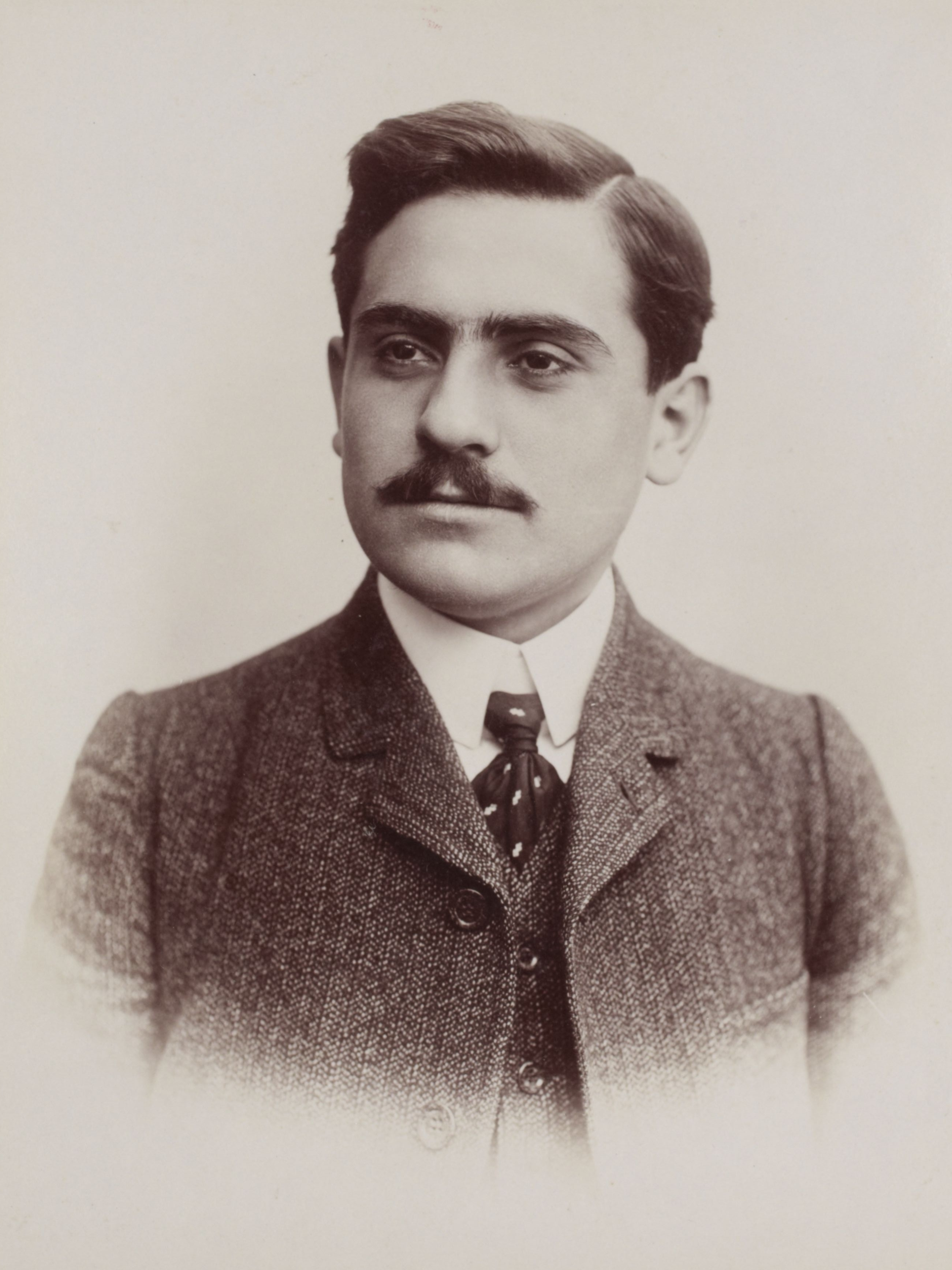
- Marcel Cadolle in 1903

Personal information
- Full name: Marcel Cadolle
- Born: 21 December 1885 Paris, France
- Died: 21 August 1956 (aged 70) Paris, France

Cycling career
- Sport: Cycling
- Discipline: Road
- Role: Rider

Professional team
- 1906–1907: Alcyon-Dunlop

Major wins
- Bordeaux–Paris

Marcel Cadolle (21 December 1885, in Paris – 21 August 1956, in Paris) was a French professional road bicycle racer.

In 1907 Cadolle rode a good Tour de France, having finished in the top 6 of all of the first six stages, winning the fourth stage. Before the seventh stage, Cadolle was second in the classification. In that seventh stage, Cadolle fell, and as a result he had to stop his cycling career.

== Major results ==
1906
Bordeaux–Paris
1907
Tour de France:

Winner stage 4
