= Lucien Petit-Breton =

French cyclist (1882–1917)

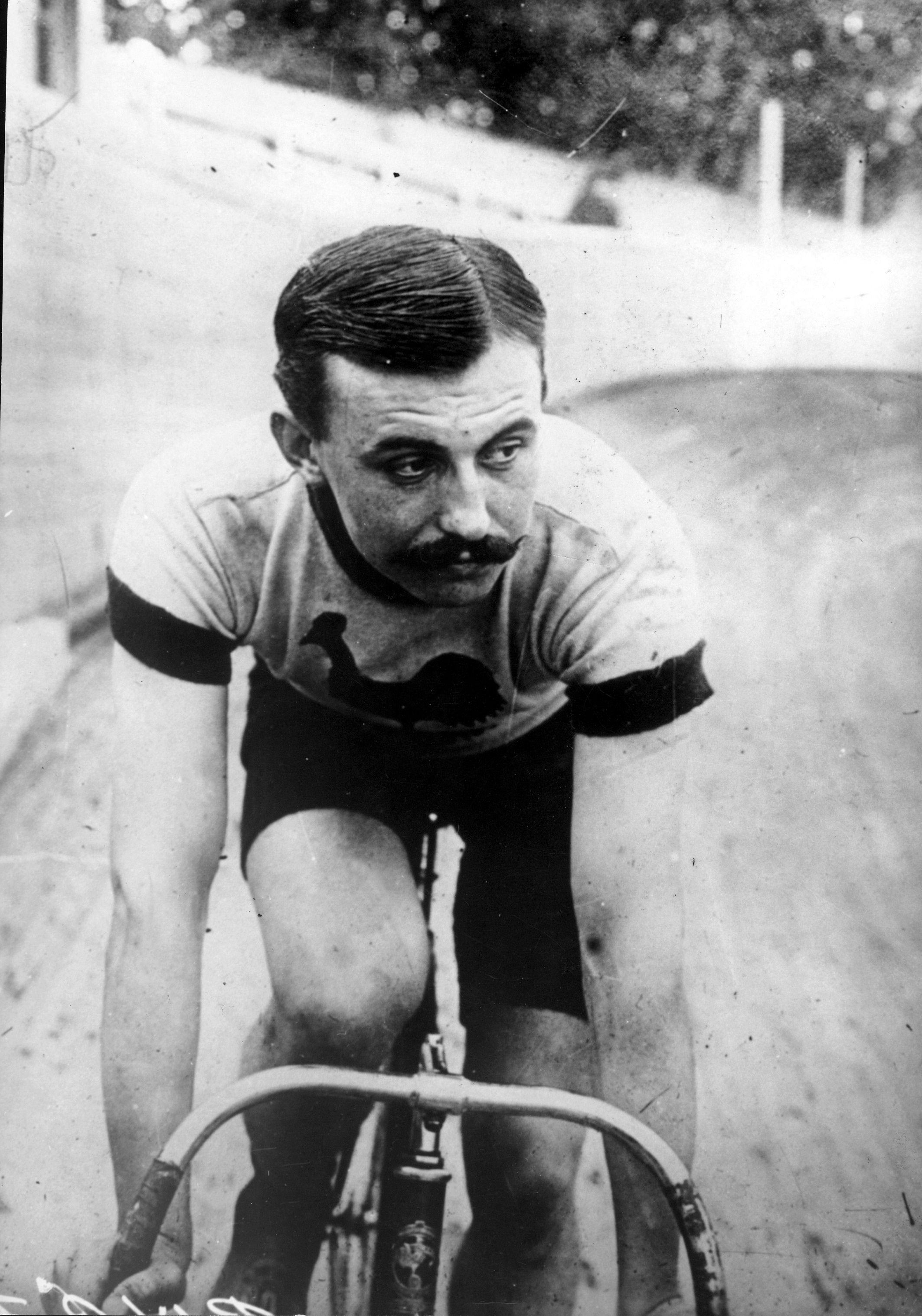

Personal information
- Full name: Lucien Georges Mazan
- Nickname: Lucien Petit-Breton
- Born: 18 October 1882 Plessé, France
- Died: 20 December 1917 (aged 35) Troyes, France

Cycling career
- Sport: Cycling
- Discipline: Road
- Role: Rider

Professional teams
- 1905: JC Cycles
- 1906-1908: Peugeot
- 1909: Legnano
- 1910: Alcyon
- 1911: Fiat
- 1911: La Française
- 1912: Peugeot
- 1913-1914: Automata
- 1914: Atala

Major wins
- Road Grand Tours Tour de France General classification (1907, 1908) 7 individual stages (1907, 1908) Giro d'Italia 1 individual stage (1911) Stage races Tour of Belgium (1908) One-day races and Classics Milan–San Remo (1907) Paris–Tours (1906) Paris–Brussels (1908) Other Hour record 41.110 km (24 August 1905)

Lucien Georges Mazan (18 October 1882 – 20 December 1917), known by the pseudonym Lucien Petit-Breton (French pronunciation: [lysjɛ̃ p(ə)ti bʁətɔ̃]), was a French racing cyclist best known as the first two-time winner of the Tour de France.

He was born in Plessé, Loire-Atlantique, a part of Brittany, now part of Pays de la Loire. When he was six he moved with his parents to Buenos Aires, Argentina, where he took the nationality. His cycling career started when he won a bike in a lottery at the age of sixteen. As his father wanted him to do a 'real' job, he adapted the nickname Lucien Breton for races, to deceive his father. Later he changed it to Petit-Breton, because there already was another cyclist called Lucien Breton.

== Professional career ==
His first notable victory was the track cycling championship of Argentina. In 1902 he was drafted in the French Army and moved back to France. In 1904 he won the Bol d'Or track event at the second attempt, having finished second the previous year and in 1905 he broke the world hour record on the Buffalo cycling track in Paris with 41.110 km. The same year he started road-racing and finished the Tour de France fifth overall. In 1906, he won the third Paris–Tours race and improved on his previous performance by finishing fourth in the Tour.

In 1907, he won the inaugural Milan–San Remo race before entering the Tour. However, by the end of stage five from Lyon to Grenoble, his chance of victory looked slim. Losing contact with the leading riders on the Col de Porte, he could only manage a tenth place, twenty eight minutes behind Emile Georget who won his third stage. However, with the points system, time was irrelevant, and he was still in second place. In the tenth stage, Georget illegally changed bicycles, and was placed last in the stage by the Tour jury, which cost him 44 points. This meant that Petit-Breton took over the lead, and with two stage wins, plus second and third places in eight other stages, he won the Tour with 47 points, 10 point ahead of second placed Gustave Garrigou and 27 points ahead of Georget in third.

He also won the Tour in 1908, becoming the first rider to win the Tour twice, after winning the Paris–Brussels race. As part of the all-conquering Peugeot team that took the first four places, Petit-Breton won the Tour even more easily with just 36 points, finishing outside the first four in just one stage. Behind him, team-mates Francois Faber and Georges Passerieu finished with 68 and 75 points respectively.

That was his last great victory. First World War ended his career. He joined the French army as a driver and died in 1917 when he crashed into a horse and cart which turned in front of him at the front near Troyes. The cart driver was said to be insensible through drink.

Before the war he had started a bicycle shop and high-quality bicycles bearing his name were made in Nantes until the 1960s.

== In popular culture ==
The French TV series Les Brigades du Tigre was a popular crime drama focusing on an elite squad of police detectives in the early 20th century. In an episode broadcast in 1978 they are appointed to watch over the competitors of the 1908 Tour de France, two of whom have been killed by a man who opposes cycling on the claim that his son was killed in a riding accident. Jacques Giraud appears as Petit Breton who is determined to continue the event come what may and persuades the other hesitant cyclists to also continue on the grounds that they should not let him win without a fight. He himself is later assaulted by the man but defiantly continues the stage to the admiration of those present.

== Career achievements ==
=== Major results ===
1906
Paris–Tours
1907
Milan–San Remo
Tour de France:

Winner overall classification
Winner stages 9 and 11

1908
Tour de France:

Winner overall classification
Winner stages 2, 7, 9, 11 and 14

Paris–Brussels
Tour of Belgium (including 4 stages)
1911
Giro d'Italia

Winner stage 5

=== Grand Tour general classification results timeline ===
Grand Tour	1905	1906	1907	1908	1909	1910	1911	1912	1913	1914
Giro d'Italia	N/A	N/A	N/A	N/A	DNE	DNF	DNF	DNE	DNE	DNE
Tour de France	5	4	1	1	DNE	DNF-7	DNF-1	DNF-2	DNF-14	DNF-9
Vuelta a España	N/A	N/A	N/A	N/A	N/A	N/A	N/A	N/A	N/A	N/A

Legend
1	Winner
2–3	Top three-finish
4–10	Top ten-finish
11–	Other finish
DNE	Did not enter
DNF-x	Did not finish (retired on stage x)
DNS-x	Did not start (not started on stage x)
HD-x	Finished outside time limit (occurred on stage x)
DSQ	Disqualified
N/A	Race/classification not held
NR	Not ranked in this classification

Records
Preceded by Willie Hamilton	UCI hour record (41.110 km); 24 August 1905 – 20 June 1907	Succeeded by Marcel Berthet
