= 1906 Paris–Tours =

Race details
- Dates: 30 September 1906
- Stages: 1
- Distance: 234 km (145 mi)
- Winning time: 7h 55' 00"

Results
	Winner	Lucien Petit-Breton (FRA)
	Second	Louis Trousselier (FRA)
	Third	Henri Cornet (FRA)

The 1906 Paris–Tours was the third edition of the Paris–Tours cycle race and was held on 30 September 1906. The race started in Paris and finished in Tours. The race was won by Lucien Petit-Breton.

== General classification ==
Final general classification

Rank	Rider	Time
1	Lucien Petit-Breton (FRA)	7h 55' 00"
2	Louis Trousselier (FRA)	+ 0"
3	Henri Cornet (FRA)	+ 10' 30"
4	Eugène Christophe (FRA)	+ 10' 50"
5	Ernest Ricaux (FRA)	+ 31' 30"
6	Paul Chauvet (FRA)	+ 31' 30"
7	Pierre Privat (FRA)	+ 31' 30"
8	Gabriel Petit (FRA)	+ 31' 30"
9	Édouard Wattelier (FRA)	+ 34' 30"
10	Eugène Delaye (FRA)	+ 34' 30"
