= François Beaugendre =

French cyclist (1880–1936)

Personal information
- Full name: François Beaugendre
- Born: 25 July 1880 Salbris, France
- Died: 6 January 1936 (aged 55) Paris, France

Cycling career
- Sport: Cycling
- Disciplines: Road and Land
- Role: Rider

Major wins
- 1 stage Tour de France

François Beaugendre (1880-1936) was an early twentieth century French road racing cyclist who participated in the 1903 Tour de France (the first Tour) and finished ninth overall. Beaugendre also rode the first four stages of the 1904 Tour de France, where he finished 7th, 11th, 3rd and 3rd, and did not start the fifth stage. Months after this Tour finished, many cyclists were disqualified, and Beaugendre's results were upgraded to 3rd, 6th, 2nd and 1st; Beaugendre was therefore declared winner of the fourth stage, and following the disqualifications he had been leader at the moment he left the race.

Beaugendre rode the Tour a few more times, his best result was the fifth place in the 1907 Tour de France.

François Beaugendre had two brothers who were also cyclists: Joseph Beaugendre rode the 1909 Tour de France, while Omer Beaugendre rode the 1910 Tour de France, having won the 1908 Paris–Tours race.

== Major results ==
1903
Tour de France

9th place overall classification

1904
Tour de France

Winner stage 4
Leading general classification for one day

1907
Tour de France

5th place overall classification

1908
Paris-Lille
1910
Geneva-Nice
