= Moïse Polydore Millaud =

French journalist (1813–1871)

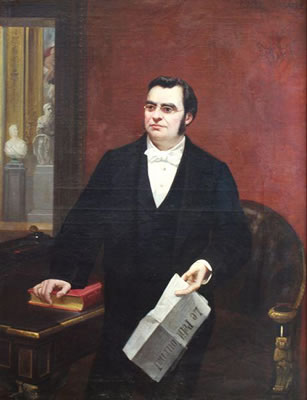
- Born: 27 August 1813; Bordeaux, France
- Died: 13 October 1871 (aged 58)
- Occupations: Banker, journalist

Moïse Polydore Millaud (French pronunciation: [mɔiz pɔlidɔʁ mijo]; 27 August 1813 – 13 October 1871) was a journalist, banker and entrepreneur who founded Le Petit Journal, at one time the leading newspaper in France.

== Family life ==
Millaud was born in Bordeaux, to Felicity (née Bellon) and Jassuda Millaud 1 (born 1769, L'Isle-sur-la-Sorgue – died 1865, Paris), Jewish merchants originally from the Papal States who originally sold horses.

Self-taught, he became a clerk to a bailiff and in 1833 founded his first newspaper in Bordeaux, Le Lutin. Moses wrote articles under the pseudonym Duallim an anagram of Millaud. His son was the journalist, writer and playwright Albert Millaud. His daughter Blanche was the wife of George Silva, the editor of the Journal des Voyageurs.

== Career - banking and journalism ==
In 1836, Moïse Millaud moved to Paris and founded Le Gamin de Paris, the first newspaper sold exclusively at the door of the theatre, and Le Négociateur, an exclusively financial newspaper.

In 1839, he founded L’Audience, a legal gazette appearing on Monday, then in 1848 La Liberté, supporting Napoleon III.

In 1848 Millaud became associated with fellow banker Jules Mirès. They established the paper "Le Conseiller du Peuple," and went on to found two banking institutions. In October 1848 they bought the Journal des Chemins de Fer which was to become the Journal des Voyageurs, a force in finance and speculation. Subsequently the companies Caisses des Actions Réunies and Caisses des Chemins de Fer merged to become Crédit Mobilier, generating three million francs each for Mirès and Millaud in 1853.

In 1854 he founded a property company to develop land in Paris, which made his fortune. He also bought the newspaper Le Dock renaming it Le Journal des actionnaires (shareholders), and created the Caisse Générale des actionnaires (Bank of Shareholders) capitalised at 25 million francs and with the object of publicising his banking activity.

Also in 1854, Millaud bought the rights of La Presse from Émile de Girardin, and throughout 1856 and 1857 hosted lavish feasts for journalists and other influential men in his hotel in the Rue Saint-Georges. In February 1857 he hosted a banquet for the Goncourt brothers, but later that year he was faced with financial difficulties and sold the newspaper to Felix Solar.

In 1854, he recruited his nephew Alphonse (born 11 June 1829, Mouriès), the son of his brother Joseph, who worked on both La Presse and Le Journal des actionnaires.

In 1863, his masterstroke was the foundation of the best-selling newspaper Le Petit Journal which was managed by his nephew Alfonso. He confided to Hippolyte de Villemessant that "We must have the courage to be silly,".

In 1864, he founded Le Journal illustré and in October 1865 he launched Le Soleil. He also created the Le Journal littéraire (Literary Journal) and Le Journal politique de la semaine (The Journal of the Week in Politics).

== Playwright ==
In 1859, he produced the play Ma nièce et mon ours (My niece and my bear) at the Théâtre du Palais-Royal, a vaudeville folly in three acts written with Louis-François Nicolaïe under the pseudonyms of Frascati and Clairville.

== Financial difficulties ==
Millaud was caught in numerous financial scandals, including those of Nassau Railroad in 1860 and Shareholders' Fund in 1861. His nephew Alphonse tried to settle the debts of his uncle, including through fraudulent partnerships of Le Petit Journal involving 4000 shares of 500 francs each, a value of 2 million francs, but estimated at 100,000. Alphonse was sentenced on 13 June 1875.

At Millaud's death, his son Albert, his nephew and his son Alfonso took over the Le Petit Journal, but financial problems led Émile de Girardin to resume governance.

== List of newspapers ==
- Le Lutin (The Imp)
- Le Gamin de Paris, 1835
- Le Glaneur (The Gleaner) 1836
- Le Négociateur (The Negotiator), 1838
- L’Audience (The Audience), 1839
- La Liberté (Freedom), 1848
- Le Journal des Chemins de fer (Journal of Railways) 1848, formerly Le Dock
- Le Conseiller du peuple (Councilor of the People), 1848
- Le Journal des actionnaires (Journal of shareholders), 1856
- La Presse (The Press), 1857
- Le Petit Journal, 1863
- Le Journal Illustré (The Illustrated Journal), 1864
- Le Soleil (The Sun), 1865
- Le Journal littéraire (Literary Journal)
- Le Journal politique de la semaine (The Journal of the Week in Politics)
