= Sophie Gay =

French writer (1776–1852)

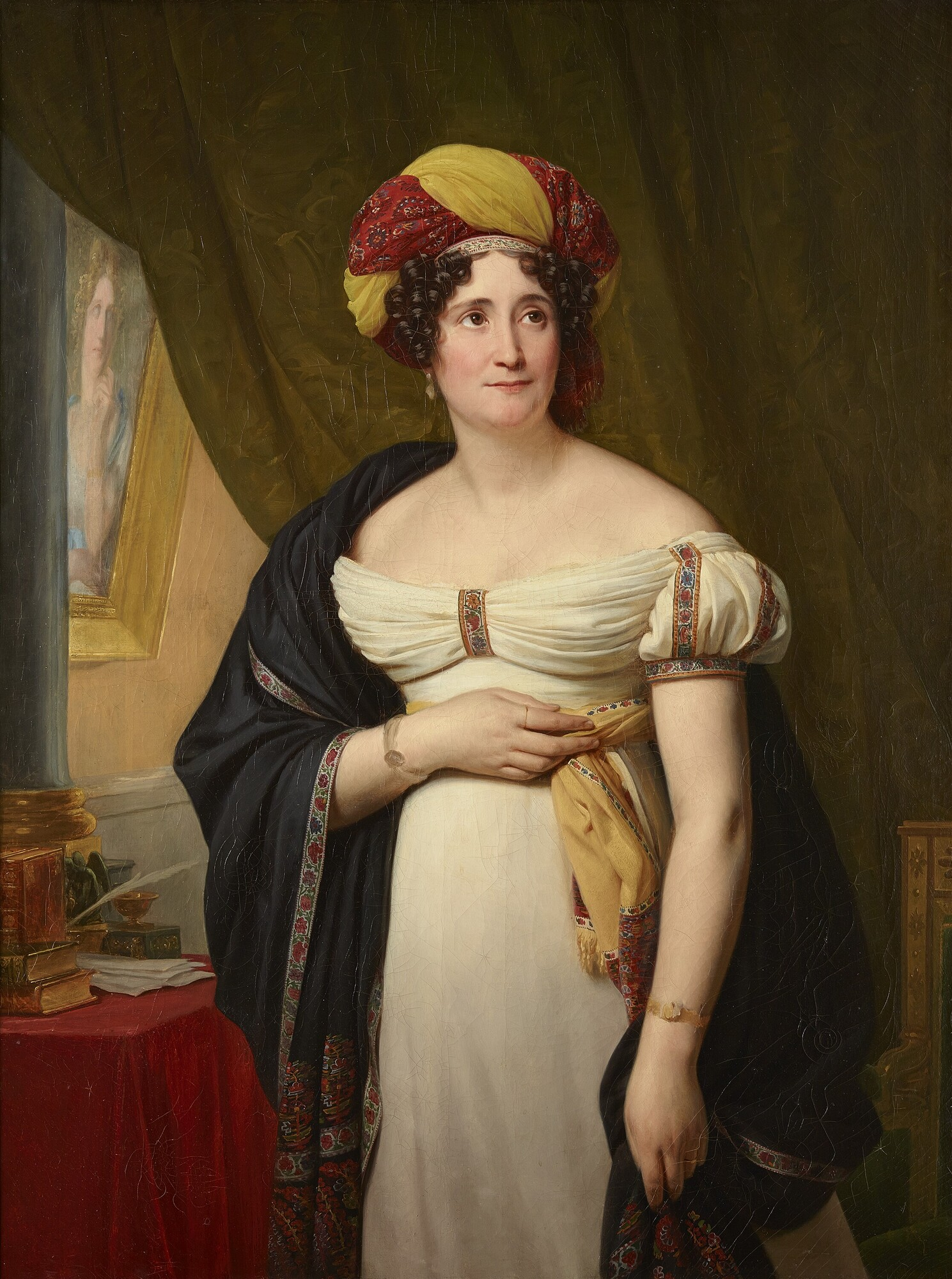
- Portrait of Sophie Gay, 1824, by Louis Hersent
- Born: 1 July 1776; Paris
- Died: 2 March 1852 (aged 75)
- Occupation: author

Marie Françoise Sophie Gay (born Nichault de la Valette; 1 July 1776 – 2 March 1852) was a French author who was born in Paris.

== Biography ==
Marie Françoise Sophie Nichault de la Valette was the daughter of Francesca Peretti, an Italian woman, and Auguste Antoine Nichault de la Valette, an entrepreneur who worked for King Louis XVIII.

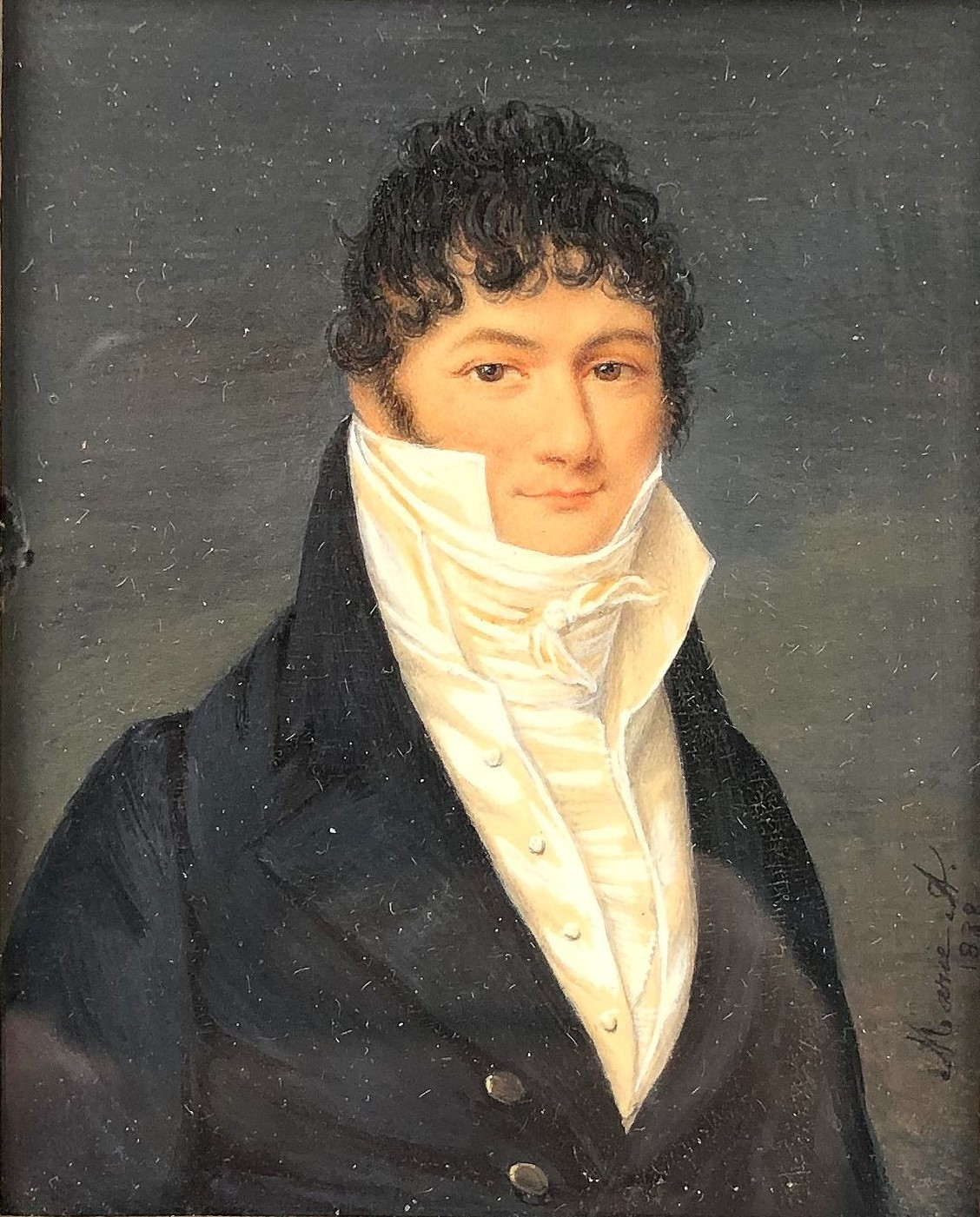
Portrait of Jean Sigismond Gay (1768-1822), Gay's second husband

She was married in 1794 to Gaspard Liottier (or Gaspar Liottier). She divorced in 1799 to marry another, Jean Sigismond Gay (1768–1822), the mayor of Lupigny, originally from Aix-les-Bains and with a close association to the French treasury, under the French First Empire. He was the contrôleur-général for the Ruhr.

She published her first written work in 1802, defending the art of the novel. Delphine by Germaine de Staël, wrote an open letter to the Journal de Paris.

That year her first published work, the novel Laure d’Estell, was anonymously published, on the advice of her publisher Sir Stanislas de Boufflers and Joseph-Alexandre Pierre de Ségur, Viscount of Ségur.

== Legacy ==
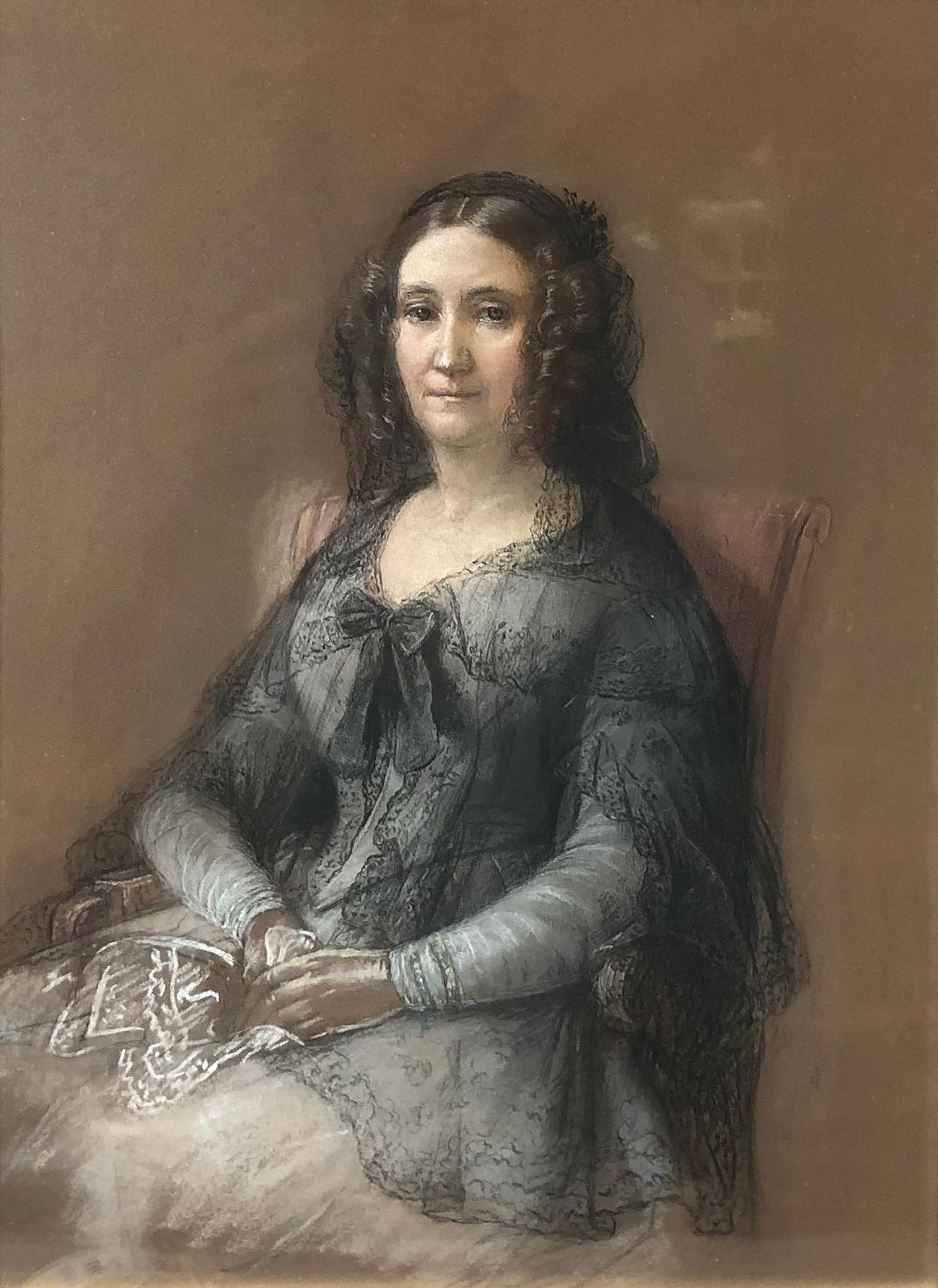
Pastel portrait of Sophia Gay, by Claire Laloua, 1842

Gay was the mother of the writer Delphine de Girardin, and her son-in-law married the chanteuse Sophie Gail.

In 1818 she wrote the libretto for the opéra comique la Sérénade by Regnard, which Sophie Gail set to music. In 1821, she was working on Chanoine de Milan by Alexandre Duval, and a comic opera entitled le Maitre de Chapelle ("Master of the House", not to be confused with Master of the House from Les Misérables (musical)).

In the meantime, Gay was also writing many others comedies and dramas. The comedy la Veuve du tanneur ("The widow of the tanner"), was a huge success at the Castellane, but the Duchesse de Châteauroux bombed at the Théâtre de l'Odéon.

She also wrote several "novel novels", Nouvelles nouvelles, as penny dreadfuls, for La Presse. She also published numerous romantic songs, accompanied on the piano, for which she wrote both the words and music: Maris is perhaps a best example, although she would also write in the elegiac style.

After being widowed, between 1826 and 1827, she took a grand tour to Italy with son.

In the later years of her life, Gay lived at Versailles during the "season". One of her daughters became the Countess O'Donnell, the other, was more famously known by the name of Delphine de Girardin, the wife of Émile de Girardin.

== Works ==
- Laure d’Estell, par Mme ***; Paris, 1802, 3 vol. in-12;
- Léonie de Montbreuse, Paris, 1813 et 1823, 2 vol. in-12; La seconde édition n’est pas anonyme.
- Anatole, Paris, 1815 et 1822, 2 vol. in-12;
- Les Malheurs d’un Amant heureux, ouvrage traduit de l’anglais, par M***, auteur de plusieurs ouvrages connus; Paris, 1818; reproduit sous le titre : les Malheurs d’un Amant heureux, ou mémoires d’un aide-de-camp de Napoléon écrits par son valet de chambre, Paris, 1823, 3 vol. in-8°;
- Le Marquis de Pomenars, comédie en un acte et en prose, Paris, Ladvocat, 1820, in-8°;
- Une Aventure du chevalier de Grammont, comédie en trois actes et en vers, Paris, 1822, in-8°;
- Marie, ou la pauvre fille, drame en trois actes et en prose, Paris, 1824, in-8°;
- Théobald, épisode de la guerre de Russie, Paris, 1828, 4 vol. in-12;
- Le Moqueur amoureux, Paris, 1830, 2 vol. in-8°;
- Un Mariage sous l’empire, Paris, 1832, 2 vol. in-8°;
- Scènes du jeune âge, Paris, 1833, 2 vol. in-8°;
- la Physiologie du Ridicule, Paris, 1833, 2 vol. in-8°;
- Souvenirs d’une vieille femme, Paris, Michel Lévy frères, 1834, in-8°: extrait des Mémoires de l’auteur;
- La Duchesse de Châteauroux, Paris, 1834 et 1839, 2 vol. in-8°;
- Le Chevalier de Canolle, opéra comique en trois actes, music by Hippolyte-Honoré-Joseph Court de Fontmichel; Paris, 1836, in-8°;
- la Comtesse d’Egmont, Paris, 1836, 2 vol. in-8°;
- Les Salons célèbres, Paris, Dumont, 1837, 2 vol. in-8°;
- Marie de Mancini, Paris, 1840, 2 vol. in-8°;
- Marie-Louise d’Orléans, Paris, 1842, 2 vol. in-8°;
- la Duchesse de Chateauroux, drame en quatre actes, joué sur le second Théâtre-Français, le 25; Paris, 1844, grand in-8°;
- Ellénore, Paris, 1844–1846, 4 vol. in-8°;
- Le joui Frère, Paris, 1845, 3 vol. in 8";
- Le Comte de Guiche, Paris, 1845, 3 vol. in-8°;
- Le Mari confident, Paris, 1849, 2 vol. in-8°;
- Société du Travail à domicile, discours suivi d’une pétition en vers en faveur de cette œuvre, Versailles, 1849, in-8°.
- Œuvres complètes de Sophie Gay, Paris, M. Lévy, 1864–1885

== Autobiography ==
For an account of her daughter, Delphine Gay, her mother's work of 1834, Souvenirs d'une vieille femme ("memoirs from an old woman. See also Théophile Gautier's Portraits contemporains and Sainte-Beuve's, Causeries du lundi (Monday's chats, essentially).

Her niece was the writer Hortense Allart.

== Sources ==
- Paul Lafond, L’Aube romantique : Jules de Rességuier et ses amis, Chateaubriand – Émile Deschamps – Sophie Gay – Madame de Girardin – Victor Hugo – Lamartine – H.T. de Latouche – Sainte-Beuve – A. Soumet – Eugène Sue – Alfred de Vigny et autres, Paris, Mercure de France, 1910
- Henri Malo, Une muse et sa mère : Delphine Gay de Girardin, Paris, Émile-Paul Frères, 1924
- Jules Manecy, Une famille de Savoie : celle de Delphine Gay, Aix-les-Bains, E. Gérente, 1904
- Jules Marsan, La Muse française, 1823–1824, Paris, É. Cornély et Cie, 1907–1909

== Sources ==
- Ferdinand Hoefer, Nouvelle Biographie générale, t. 19, Paris, Firmin-Didot, 1857, pp. 751–3.
- 7 S : Fonds Gay, archives municipales d'Aix-les-Bains, Savoie
