= Hippolyte Auguste Marinoni =

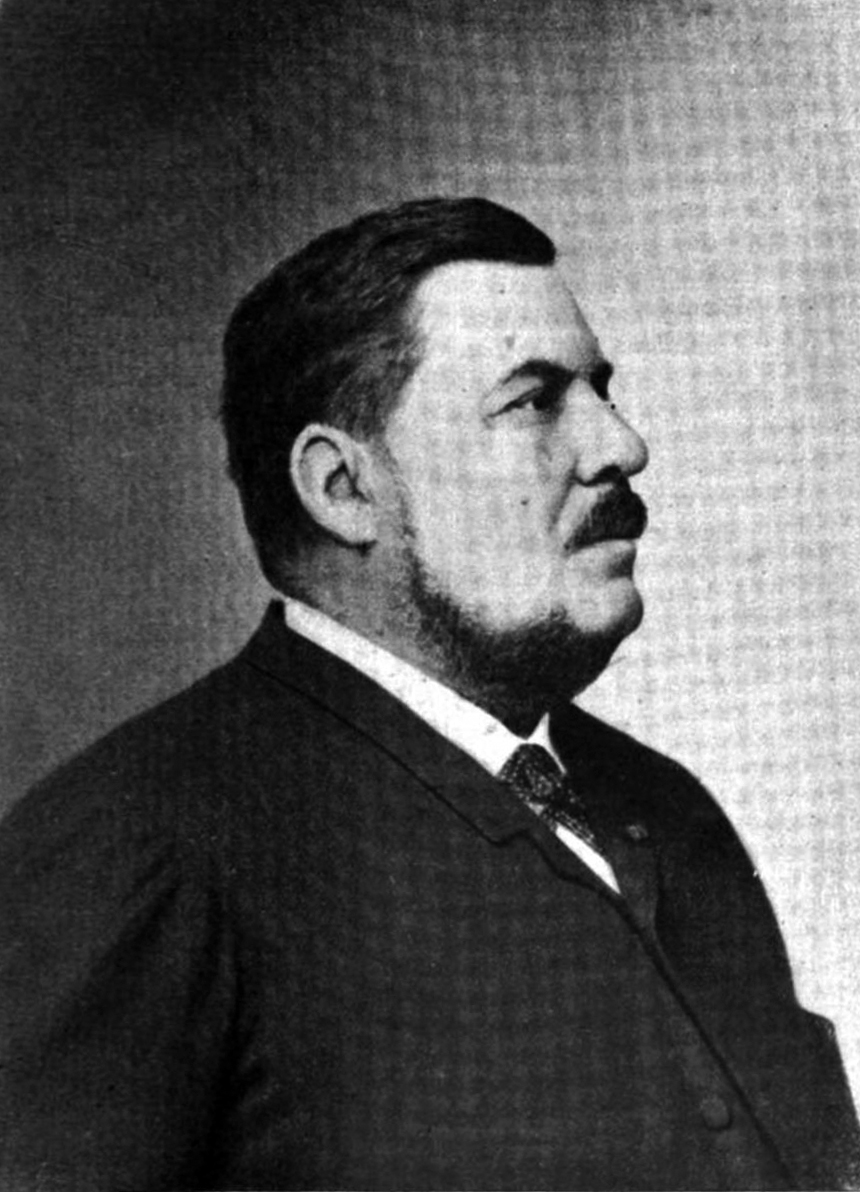
Hippolyte Auguste Marinoni; from La presse française au vingtième siècle, by Henri Avenel, E. Flammarion, 1901.

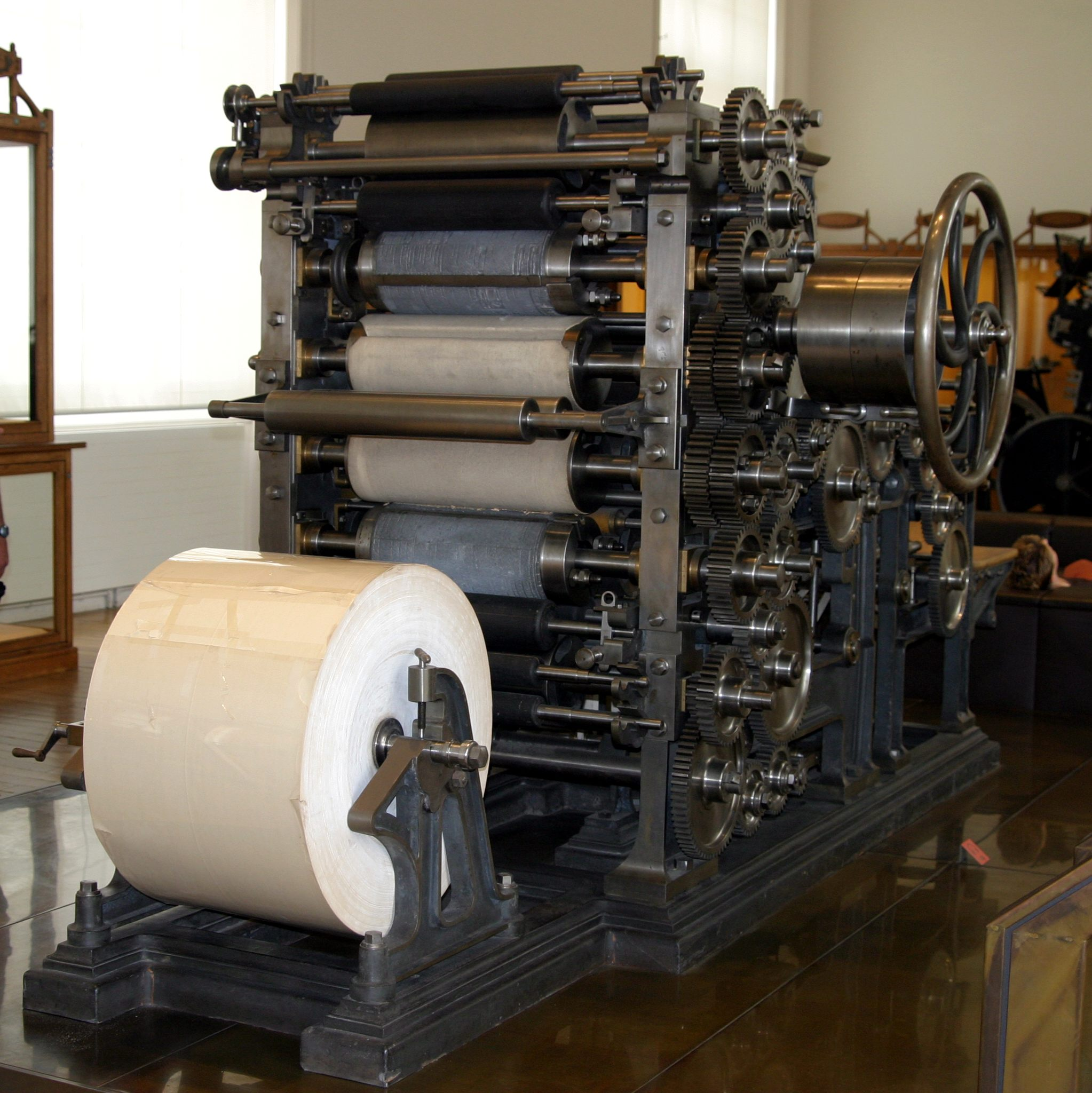
A Marinoni press from 1883; at the Musée des Arts et Métiers

Hippolyte Auguste Marinoni (8 September 1823, Paris – 7 January 1904, Paris) was a builder of rotary printing presses; most of which used the rotogravure process. He was also a media patron and owned several periodicals; notably Le Petit Journal. His is considered to be one of the first to apply modern printing technology to mass-produced publications.

== Biography ==
His father was originally from Brescia and had served as a dragoon in the Napoleonic armies. At the time of his birth, his father was serving as a brigadier in the National Gendarmerie of Paris, and he was born in the barracks at the Barrière d’Enfer. After his father's death in 1830, he was apprenticed to a turner mechanic. In 1837, aged only fourteen, he received a patent on a device for husking rice and cottonseeds.

The following year, he found employment at the firm of Pierre-Alexandre Gaveaux (1782–1844); a manufacturer of printing equipment. In 1847, he built his first press with two cylinders, dubbed "The Jet", which was able to print 1,500 sheets per hour. In 1850, he worked with Jacob Worms, a German immigrant who was experimenting with ways to improve the rotary printing process at the offices of La Presse. Shortly after, Worms moved to New York and, although he received several patents, his improvements never saw widespread commercial application.

Marinoni built on Worms' work, however and, in 1866, filed for patents on a duplex press (one that prints on both sides) with a six-cylinder feeder known as the "presse rotative à plieuse" (rotary press folding machine). In 1872, he installed his new press at La Liberté, a short-lived journal published by Émile de Girardin, then installed five of them at Le Petit Journal. A year later, the Millaud family put its interests in the paper up for sale. It was acquired by a group of investors headed by Girardin and Marinoni.

In 1882, Marinoni took sole control of the Journal. He introduced a Sunday supplement in 1889 that was one of the first to have illustrations in color. With sensational stories on crimes, accidents and gossip, it was also one of the world's first tabloids.

"Presses Marinoni" became one of the principal suppliers of offset presses in France. In 1921, it merged with the Voirin company of Montataire, founded by Henri Voirin (1827–1887), a press-builder for the firm of Rousselet-Normand. In 1963, the company was acquired by Harris Graphics, an American firm known for its development of high-speed press feeders. In 1986, Harris became a subsidiary of AM International (known for the Addressograph), and they are now both part of GOSS International, of Durham, New Hampshire.
