= Le Petit Parisien =

Newspaper published in Paris, 1876–1944

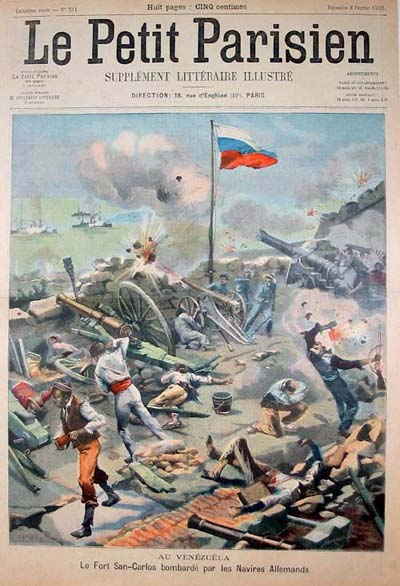
- Illustrated literary supplement, January 1903.
- Type: Daily newspaper
- Format: Broadsheet
- Founded: 1876
- Ceased publication: 1944
- Headquarters: Paris
- Circulation: 2,000,000+ <1920s> Daily

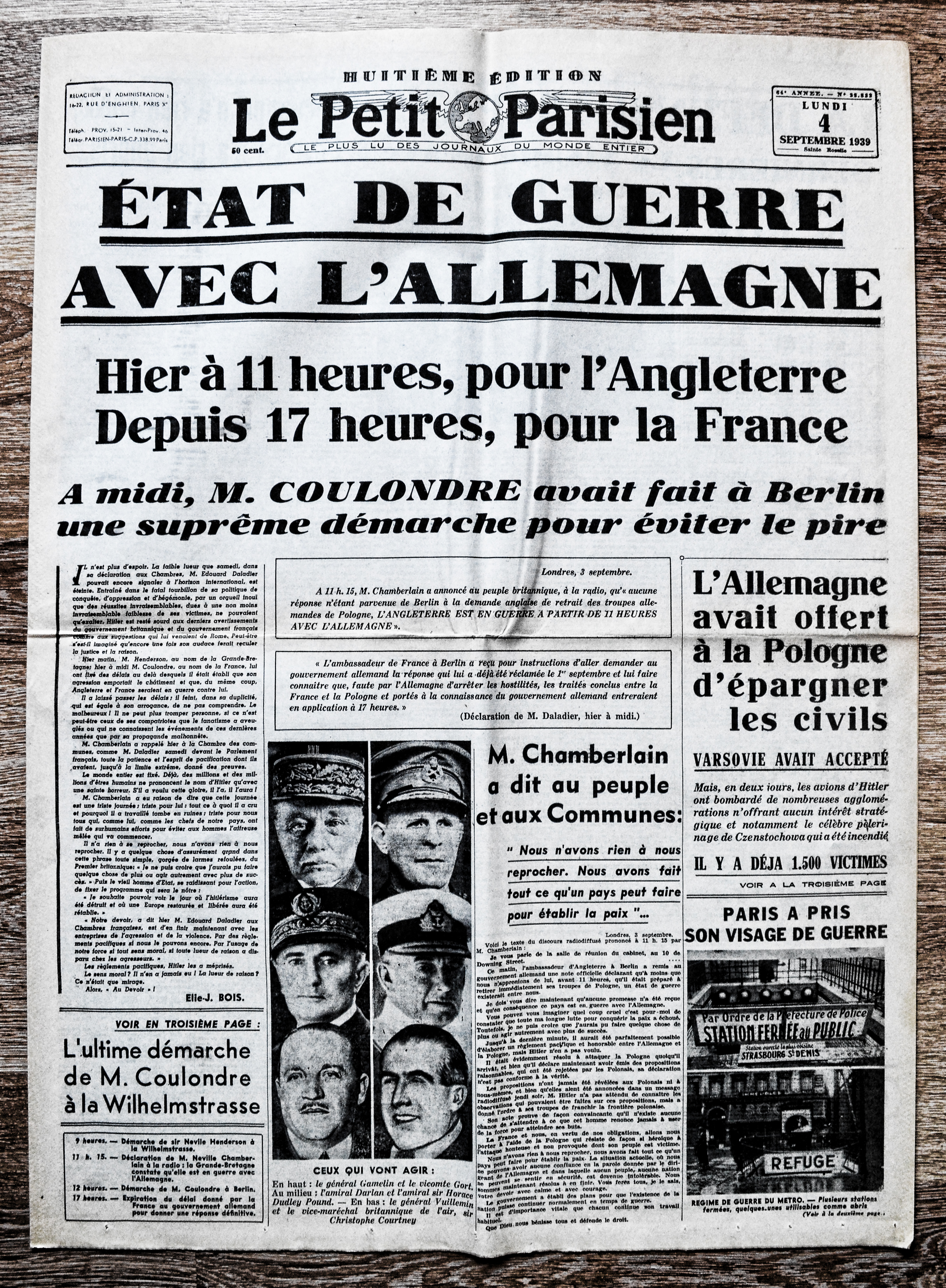
Front page on 4 September 1939, headlining the French declaration of war against Germany, three days after the start of World War II

Le Petit Parisien (French pronunciation: [lə pəti paʁizjɛ̃]) was a prominent French newspaper during the Third Republic. It was published between 1876 and 1944, and its circulation was more than two million copies after the First World War.

== Publishing ==
Despite its name, the paper was circulated across France, and records showed claims that it had the biggest newspaper circulation in the world at this time. In May 1927, the paper fell into a media prank set up by Jean-Paul Sartre and his friends, announcing that Charles Lindbergh was going to be awarded as École Normale Supérieure honorary student. During the Second World War the paper, under the editorship of Claude Jeantet, was the official voice of the Vichy regime and in 1944 was briefly published by Jeantet in Nazi Germany before closing down.

== Background ==
Prior to the twentieth century, newspapers were largely political such as Paris's La Presse. This is largely because newspapers held close ties with political parties in order to profit. However, this led to a stunt in circulation. The creation of Joseph Pulitzer's newspaper Le Matin inspired a new type of journalism. It prompted the start of Le Petit Journal and Le Petit Parisien which launched French journalism into a mass medium. These newspapers offered sensationalized news rather than relying on political propaganda which also meant they avoided the tax held on most political newspapers. This new style, reporting on topics such as finance and fashion, targeted mid to lower class readers. Appealing to this demographic helped launch Le Petit Parisien's circulation to the millions.

== Illustration ==
Le Petit Parisien featured a weekly, Sunday illustration located on their front pages. These illustrations were often visual representation of current events and paired with an article located within the newspaper. Because photography was not readily available, the newspaper relied on local artists to provide drawings and sketches for human interest stories. The purpose of these illustrated covers was to capture the eye of the passerby. Some illustrations are noted as risqué or scandalous, with the intentional use of getting the attention of readers. These covers are studied by many artists for their aesthetic appeal and many researchers for their impact on sales.

== Writers ==
Up until the mid-twentieth century, there was no formal school for journalism in Europe. Therefore, the writers for Le Petit Parisien had no journalism education and were often activists and elite authors with many areas of expertise. Among the newspaper's guest writers was international correspondent Andrée Viollis.

== Collapse ==
During the interwar years, the heavy swap of editors suggests that Le Petit Parisien was suffering the effects of unregulated media ownership that plagued France until the 1980s. Le Petit Parisien did not survive its policy of collaboration with the German invaders during World War II, in spite of its efforts towards rehabilitation.

== National Library of France—Gallica ==
All copies of Le Petit Parisien can be found at the National Library of France—Gallica website.

== See also ==
- History of French journalism
