= Émile (novel) =

Autobiographical novel by Émile de Girardin

Émile, Fragmens is an 1827 autobiographical novel by Émile de Girardin, based on Girardin's early life. A second edition was published in 1842.

The novel emphasizes the unjust social isolation of illegitimate children, exaggerating some of the details of Giardin's own experience as the bastard of the Count of Girardin. The titular character Émile is unable to find a place among the aristocracy or among the working class; after a series of rejections, he is placed in a mental hospital, and at his death is buried in a common grave. A recurring character in the novel is Mathilde, an object of romance for the protagonist; when Girardin later married Delphine Gay, she published an elegy from Mathilde's point of view.

The novel was highly praised by Jules Janin in his newspaper Le Figaro, and was described as receiving "a merited success" ("un succès mérité"). The positive reception of the novel launched Girardin's social reputation, earning him entry to fashionable literary salons.
