= Le Petit Journal (newspaper) =

Conservative Parisian daily newspaper published from 1863 to 1944

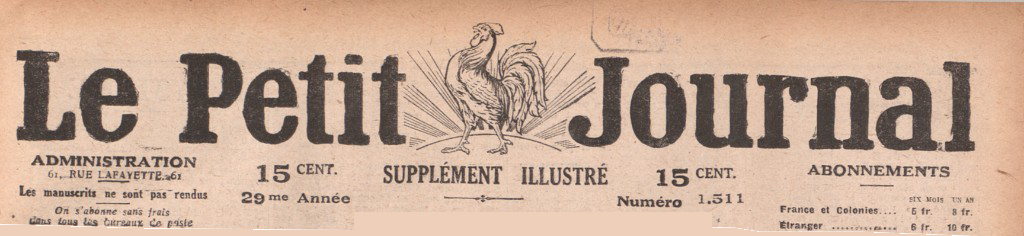
- Le Petit Journal header

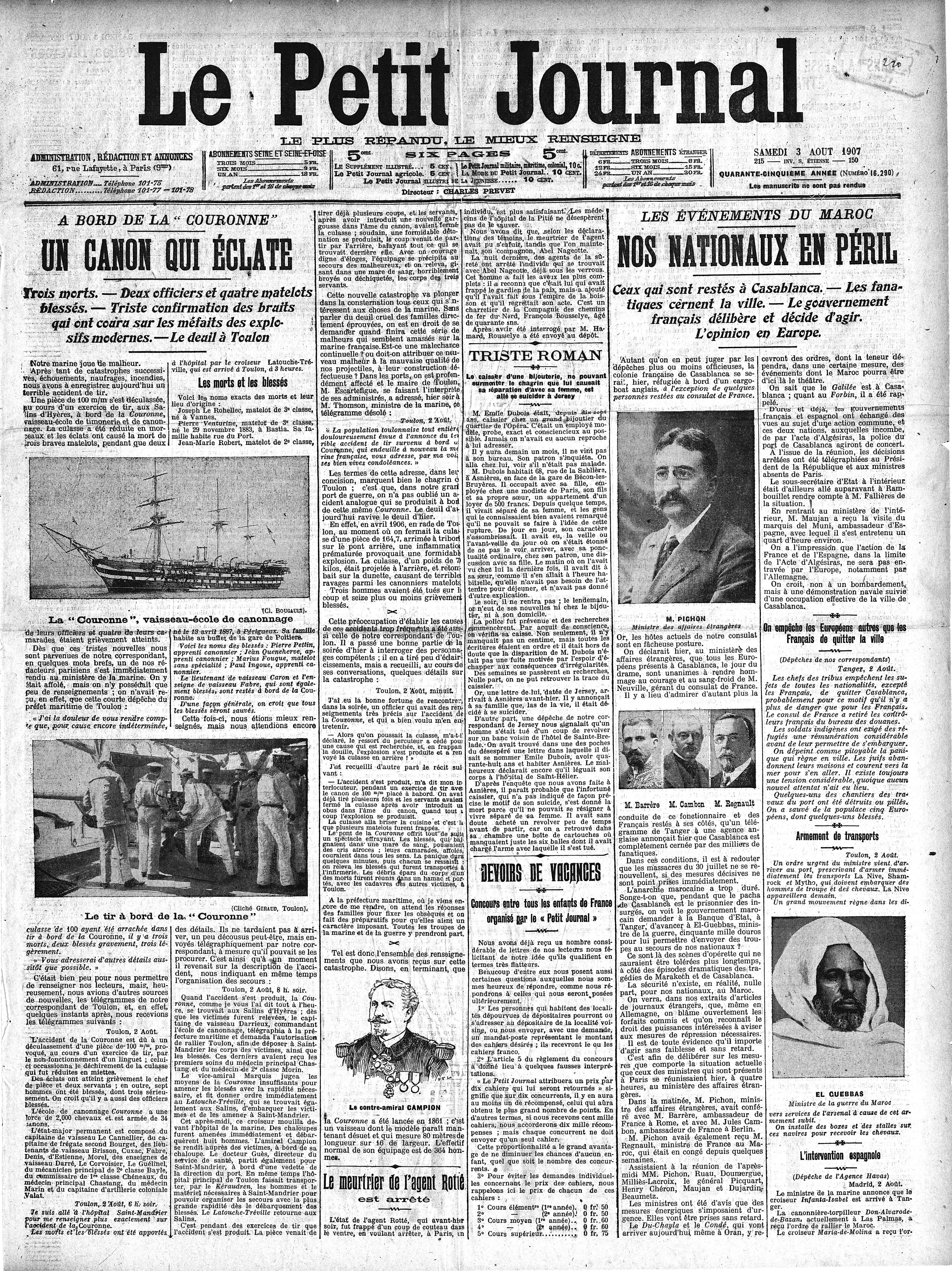
- Front page of Le Petit Journal on 3 August 1907, reporting about the Bombardment of Casablanca during French conquest of Morocco
- Type: Daily newspaper
- Format: Broadsheet
- Owner(s): Moïse Polydore Millaud; Hippolyte Auguste Marinoni
- Publisher: Moïse Polydore Millaud
- Founded: 1863
- Ceased publication: 1944
- Headquarters: Paris
- Circulation: 1,000,000 (1890s) daily
- ISSN: 1256-0464

Le Petit Journal (pronounced [lə pəti ʒuʁnal]) was a conservative daily Parisian newspaper founded by Moïse Polydore Millaud, published from 1863 to 1944. Together with Le Petit Parisien, Le Matin, and Le Journal, it was one of the four major French dailies. In 1890, during the Boulangiste crisis, its circulation first reached one million copies. Five years later, it had a circulation of two million copies, making it the world's largest newspaper.

== History ==
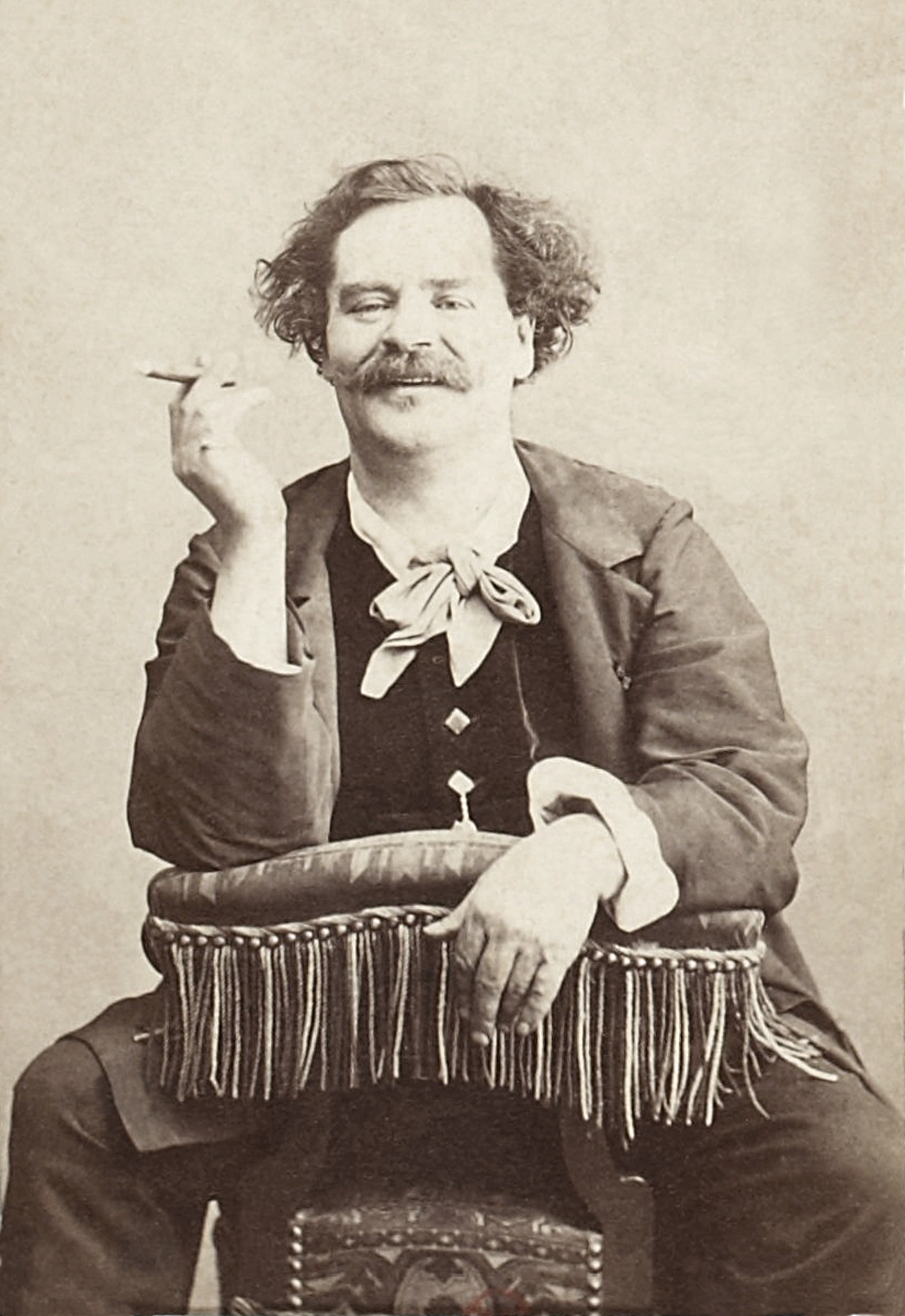
Timothée Trimm, the first editor of the Journal

=== Early years ===
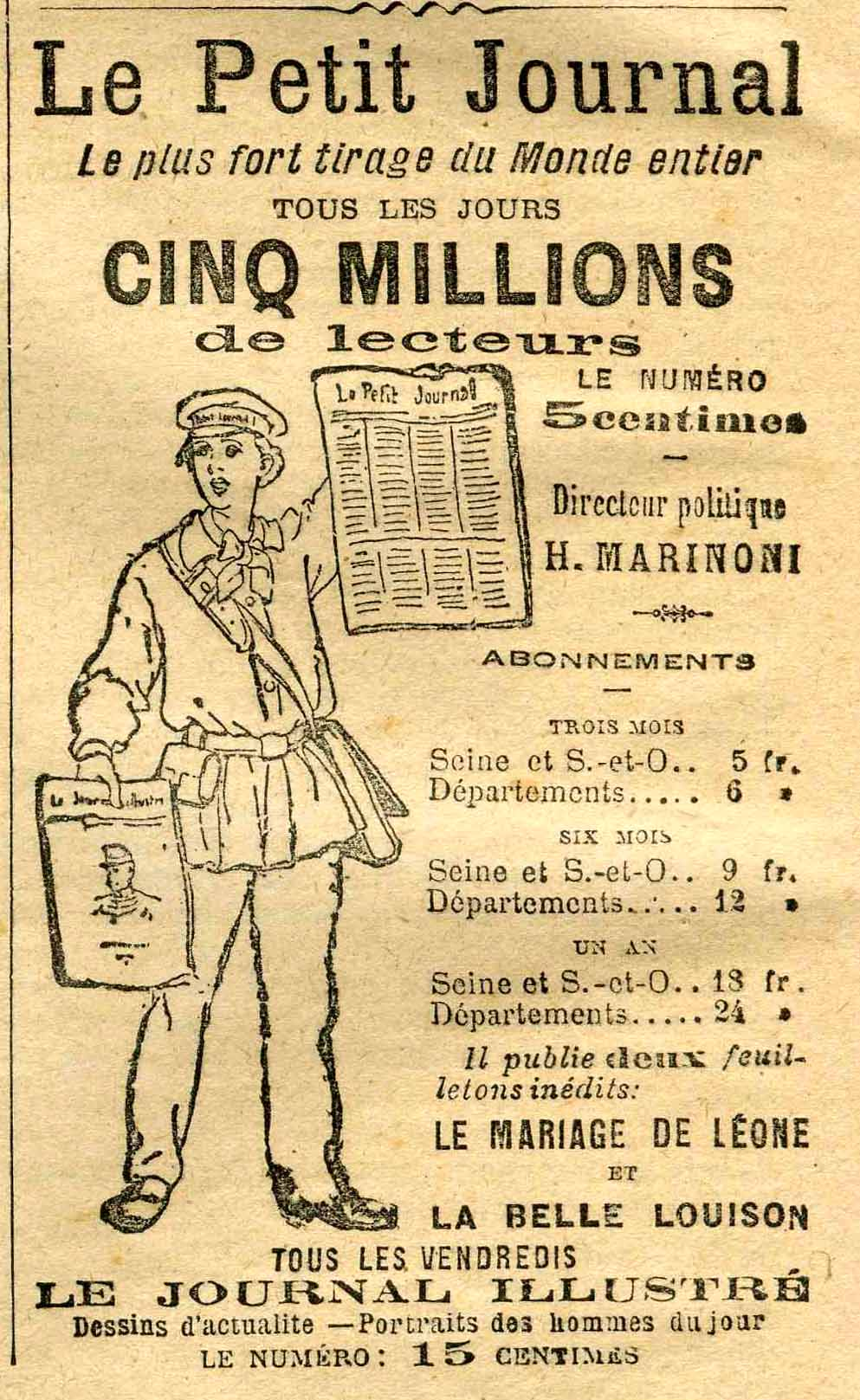
In 1899 the Journal claimed 5 million readers.

The first issue of the Journal appeared on 1 February 1863 with a printing of 83,000 copies. Its founder, Millaud, was originally from Bordeaux and had begun as a publisher of financial and legal newsletters. For a few years, he was the owner of La Presse, an early penny paper. The first printing ran to 83,000 copies, a large printing compared to the other serious newspapers. For example, Le Siècle typically had a press run of 50,000 copies.

Within two years the Journal was printing 259,000 copies, making it the largest daily in Paris. By 1870, it had reached 340,000 copies, twice the figure for the other major dailies put together. Much of this progress was made possible by the rotary presses that had been designed by Hippolyte Auguste Marinoni in 1866 and installed at the Journal in 1872.

Despite its apparent successes, the Millaud family found themselves in financial difficulties and, in 1873, sold their interests in the company to a group headed by Émile de Girardin. In 1882, Marinoni took control of the Journal, succeeding Girardin. In 1884, he introduced the Supplément illustré, a weekly Sunday supplement that was the first to feature colour illustrations. This became so popular that, in 1889, Marinoni developed a colour rotary press that could print 20,000 sheets per hour. By 1895, one million copies of the supplement were being produced every week and the Journal had a press run of two million copies, 80% of which went to the provinces, making it France's predominant newspaper.

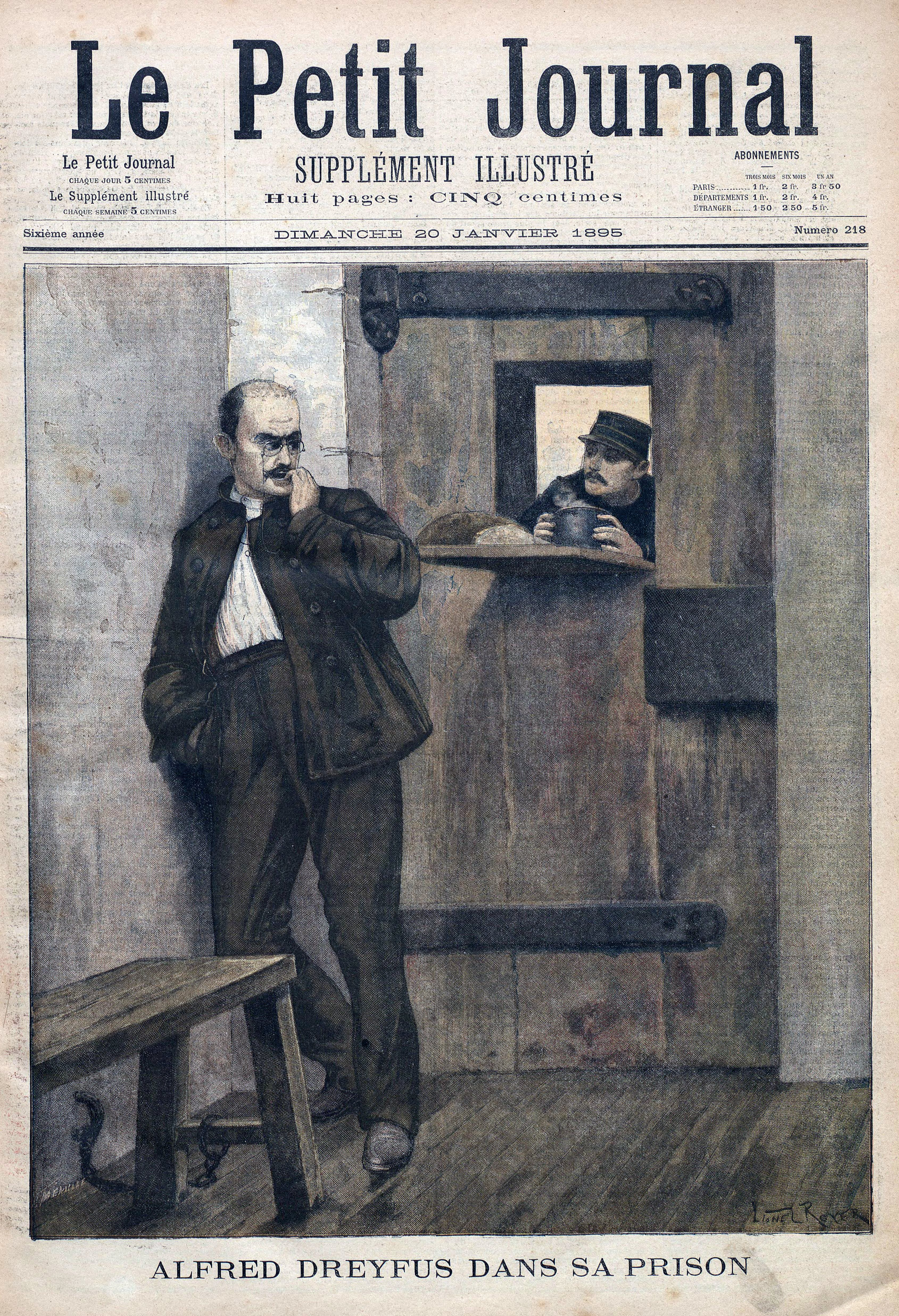
Dreyfus in prison, 20 January 1895

=== Later years and decline ===
By 1900, the paper's growth was slowing considerably. Many of its readers had gone over to Le Petit Parisien because that paper had avoided taking sides in the Dreyfus affair, whereas Ernest Judet, the Journal's editor, was staunchly anti-Dreyfus. Soon after, Le Petit Parisien became France's best-selling newspaper. By 1914, the Journal's printing run had decreased to 850,000. By 1919, it had fallen to 400,000.

In 1937, the Journal became the official party newspaper of the French Social Party (French: Parti social français, PSF). The party's leader, François de La Rocque, became the director of the Journal and frequently contributed articles. Despite receiving support from many notable figures, including the press magnate Raymond Patenôtre, its decline continued and, by 1937, the typical press run was only 150,000.

In World War II, Le Petit Journal's headquarters was moved to Clermont-Ferrand, which was part of the unoccupied "free zone" established after the armistice of 1940. The PSF officially disbanded in accordance with the ban on political parties within the new regime, renaming their organisation to French Social Progress (French: Progrès Social Français). Le Petit Journal remained connected to the renamed PSF. François de La Roque continued to serve as the Journal's director, writing articles until he, along with seven of the nine members of the board of directors were arrested for aiding the French Resistance in March 1943.

Le Petit Journal continued to publish until Allied forces liberated Cleremont-Ferrand from German occupation in 1944. The new provisional government banned the PSF and Le Petit Journal for collaborating with the occupation, and de La Roque was placed in custody awaiting trial despite his resistance activities. De La Rocque died in 1946, ending any chance of a post-war revival of the PSF. The last edition of Le Petit Journal was published on 26 August 1944.

Metz et la Lorraine returned to France (French: Metz et la Lorraine rendue à la France), 8 December 1918.

== Description and contents ==
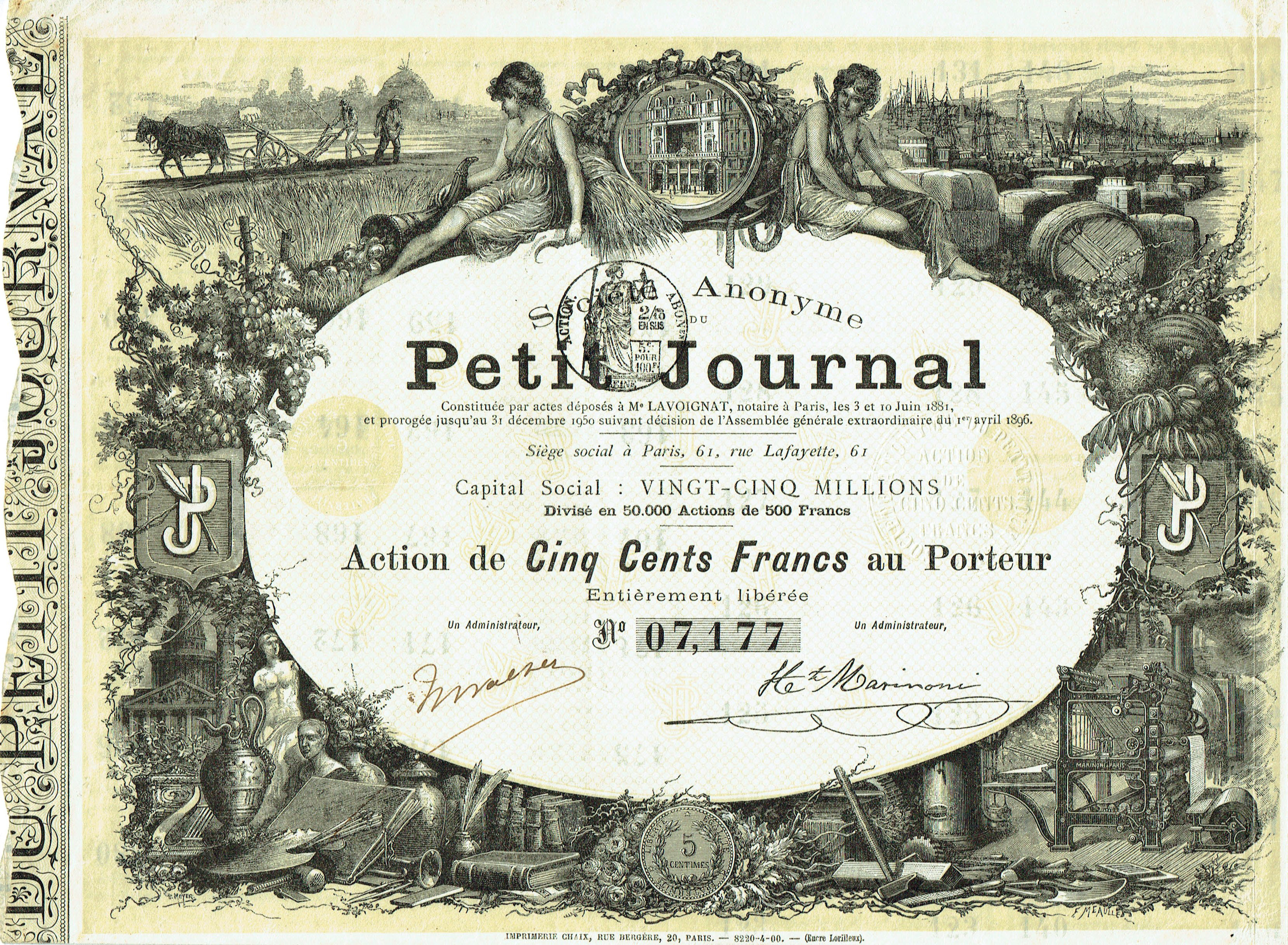
Share of the SA du Petit Journal, issued 1 April 1896 with the 5 centimes coin at the bottom

Part of the Journal's attraction was its low price. Because in the beginning it officially (if not actually) did not cover politics, it avoided paying the 10 centimes newspaper tax, and therefore could be sold for only 5 centimes, as opposed to 15 centimes for the typical daily. It came in a convenient format of 43×30 cm (17×12 ins.), did not require a subscription and, in addition to the news, offered feature stories, serials (including the popular detective stories of Émile Gaboriau), horoscopes and opinion pieces. Also, it was distributed in the evening, so it could be hawked to workers leaving their shops and factories.

One of the Journal's major innovations, that made a substantial contribution to its popularity, was the publishing of detailed minutes from sensational trials, beginning with the Troppmann affair in 1869. The exploitation of this affair enabled the Journal to almost double its readership. It was also one of the earliest instances of a publication's journalistic ethics being called to serious account.

=== Paris-Brest-Paris Bicycle Race ===
Le Petit Journal played an important role in the development of French bicycle racing. Long distance racing began with Paris-Rouen in 1869; however, after the devastation of the Franco-Prussian War, city-to-city French racing went dormant for over two decades. Eager to attract new readers and to prove French cycling superiority, Le Petit Journal's editor Pierre Giffard, writing under the pseudonym 'Jean-sans-Terre', began covering bike racing. The smaller Le Véloce-sport organized the 572-kilometer Bordeaux–Paris on 23 May 1891, but its amateur status (a move to appease the British cycling union) meant that French professionals could not compete.

Three months after Bordeaux-Paris, the first Paris-Brest-Paris began on 6 September 1891. The 1,196 km course ran from Paris to the Breton port of Brest and back. The French professional Charles Terront won the race in 72 hours. Paris-Brest-Paris affectionately became known as 'la grande course du Petit Journal.' Twelve years later, the first Tour de France would be held, similarly sponsored by a newspaper publication, L'Auto.

== National Library of France – Gallica ==
All copies of Le Petit Journal are stored at the National Library France – Gallica. They can be freely accessed online at Gallica, Online Archive, Le Petit Journal Index

== See also ==
- History of French journalism
- Pierre Giffard
