= History of French journalism =

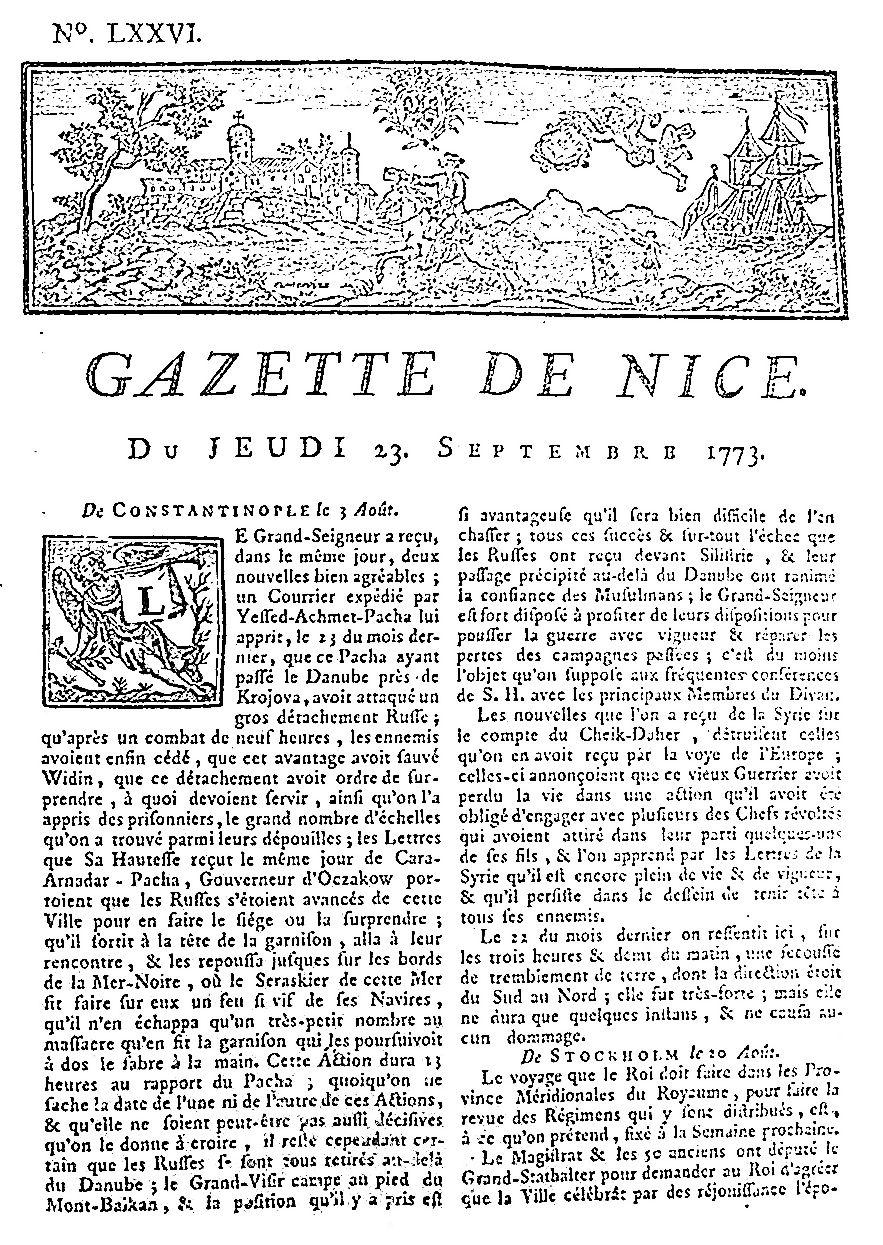

Newspapers have played a major role in French politics, economy and society since the 17th century.

== 1789–1815: Revolutionary era ==
=== Pre- and early Revolution ===
Print media played a significant role in the formation of popular public opinion towards the monarchy and Old Regime. Under the Old Regime, France had a small number of heavily censored newspapers which needed royal licenses to operate; papers without licenses had to operate underground. Both the brief public opinion pamphlets and daily life periodicals were reviewed and edited heavily in order to indirectly influence the people, even hiring writers for such propaganda. Radical Republican journalism experienced a dramatic proliferation as the Estates General convened: “in that month [May 1789] over a hundred pamphlets appeared… and the figure rose to 300 in June”. Between 1789 and 1799, over 1,300 new newspapers had emerged, combined with a large demand for pamphlets and periodical literature, which caused a flowering, albeit short-lived press. While official regulations attempted to suppress dissent in large-scale publications, some smaller papers and journals provided readers with more radical subject matter.

The increasing popularity of these revolutionary publications was reflected in the increased political activity of the French population, particularly those in Paris, where citizens flocked to coffeehouses to read pamphlets and newspapers and to listen to orators. Two important newspapers of the time were Friend of the People, and The Defender of the Constitution, which were operated by Marat and Robespierre respectively. While both papers presented republican arguments and anti-religious sentiments, the result was a direct competition for support from the same readers.

Such is the case of the royalist daily pamphlet: Ami du Roi produced and distributed by the abbé Royou and his influential sister, Madame Fréfron. The pamphlet began on September 1, 1790 and it was one of the most widely read right-wing journals. After a short run, the paper was denounced in May 1792 by the Assembly citing its news briefs condemning the Civil Constitution of the Clergy. This was especially inflammatory following the shootings on the Champ de Mars just a year before in July, where a large number of protesters illegally gathered signatures. They resisted the National Guard with stolen arms and fifty people died during the confrontation. Both liberal and conservative publications together became the main communication medium; newspapers were read aloud in taverns and clubs and circulated amongst patrons.

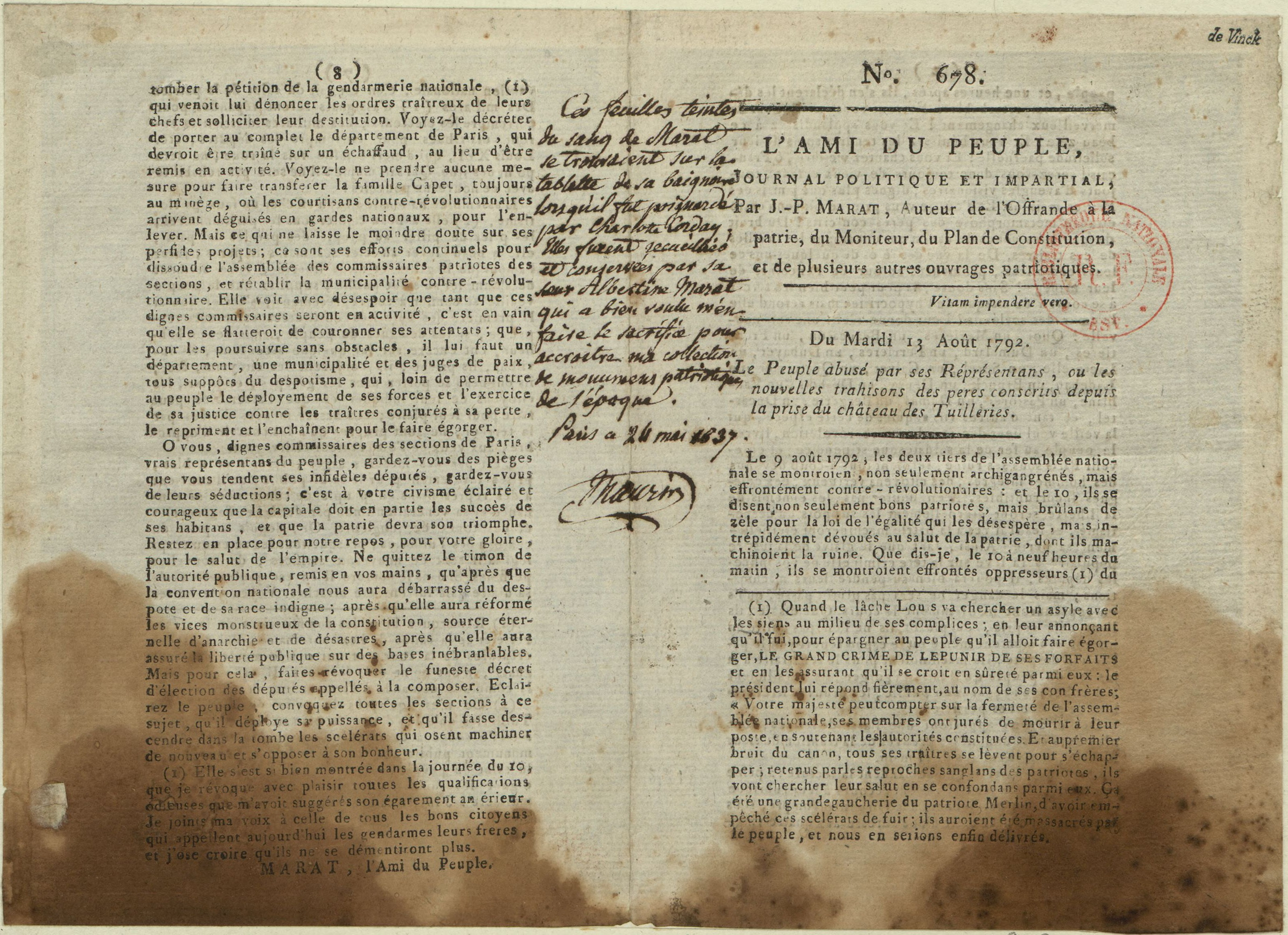
A copy of L’Ami du peuple stained with the blood of Marat

=== Reign of Terror ===
During the conservative era of the Directory, from 1794 to 1799, newspapers declined sharply in importance. The Declaration of the Rights of Man and of the Citizen allowed for the freedom of the press but also allowed for the government to repress abuses of the press. This allowed the government to define “abuses of the press” as it saw fit and justified the heavy censorship that took place during the Revolution. At the height of the Reign of Terror, the government's press censorship was stricter than that of the Old Regime, censoring hundreds of papers and brochures that did not align with the government's policies or ideals. Newspapers changed their names and titles frequently to avoid being censored or banned, and multiple journalists were executed at the guillotine during this time including Jacques Pierre Brissot and Camille Desmoulins.

=== Napoleonic Era ===
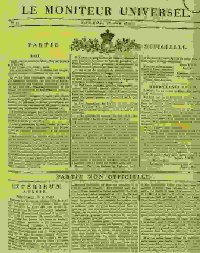

The Moniteur Universel served as the official record of legislative debates. Jean-Paul Marat gained enormous influence through his powerful L'Ami du peuple with its attacks on scandals and conspiracies that alarmed the people until he was assassinated in 1793. In addition to Marat, numerous important politicians came to the fore through journalism, including Maximilien de Robespierre and Jacques Hébert. In 1789, all restrictions on the press were eliminated; by 1793 over 400 newspapers had been founded, including 150 in Paris alone. During the conservative era of the Directory, from 1794 to 1799, newspapers declined sharply in importance. When Napoleon took power in 1799, only seventy-two papers were left in Paris, and he soon closed all but 13. In 1811, he took the final step: he allowed only four papers in Paris and one in each of the other departments; all of them closely censored. It is recognized that propaganda was heavily used throughout the rise of Napoleon. Napoleon utilized propaganda in a wide range of media including newspapers, art, theatres, and his famous bulletins. Through the use of media, Napoleon proved to be an early master of modern propaganda. Napoleon ensured that his efforts were being met by not only censoring the majority of media content but by also creating and publishing his own works. For example, Napoleon owned two military newspapers, the Courrier de l’Armée d’Italie and La France vue de l’Armée d’Italie. This allowed Napoleon to distribute propaganda related to his military successes, which swayed public opinion in France in his favor. Under Napoleon, the organ of official information was the Moniteur (Gazette nationale, ou le moniteur universal), which was founded in 1789 under the same general management as the Mercure. Both newspapers were sources of establishment messages and written for an establishment audience, with the Moniteur representing the majority view in the French assembly and the Mercure representing the minority.

== 1815–1871 ==
The restoration of the House of Bourbon in 1815 allowed for a free press. The Serre laws, passed in May 1819, would govern press freedom in France for much of the nineteenth century. Under these laws, censorship was light, but there were restrictions such as the requirement to pay a large deposit with the government, and a stamp tax of five centimes on each copy. A handful of newspapers were published, closely aligned with political factions. They were expensive, sold only by subscription, and served by a small elite.

In the mid-19th century, 1815-1880s, a series of technical innovations revolutionized the newspaper industry and made possible mass production of cheap copies for a mass national readership. The telegraph arrived in 1845, and, about 1870, the rotary press developed by Hippolyte Auguste Marinoni. Previously, publishers used expensive rag paper and slow hand-operated screw presses. Now they used much cheaper wood pulp paper, on high-speed presses. The cost of production fell by an order of magnitude. The opening of the railway system in the 1860s made rapid distribution possible between Paris and all the outlying cities and provinces. As a result of the technical revolution, much greater quantities of news was distributed much faster, and more cheaply. In June 1836 La Presse became the first French newspaper to include paid advertising in its pages, allowing it to lower its price, extend its readership and increase its profitability; other titles soon copied the formula.

The revolution of 1848 gave rise to many ephemeral papers. However, liberty of the press disappeared in 1851 under the Second Empire of Napoleon III. Most newspapers were suppressed; each party was allowed only one paper. The severity of the censorship relax in the 1860s but did not end until the French Third Republic started in 1871.

Le Correspondent founded in 1843 and published fortnightly, expressed liberal Catholic opinion, urged a restoration of freedom in France, resisted a growing anti-clericalism, and fought its conservative Catholic rival paper L'Univers. The paper clashed with government censors. In 1848 editors were convicted of "inciting hate and scorn of the government." The paper had many supporters and the emperor issued a pardon. In 1861 authorities forced the dismissal of a professor at the University of Lyons for an offensive article he wrote. The circulation was 3,290 in 1861, 5,000 in 1868, and 4,500 in 1869.

Émile de Girardin (1806–1881) was a French journalist and publisher who presented his work as a means of promoting mass education through mass journalism. His magazines reached more than 100,000 subscribers. His inexpensive daily newspaper, La Presse, sold at about half the price of its competitors, which was made possible by lower production costs and greater reliance on advertising. Girardin was active in politics and served in parliament, but he never held high office. Contemporaries and historians regarded him as a skilled polemicist, knowm for short, pointed sentences.

== Modern France: 1871–1918 ==
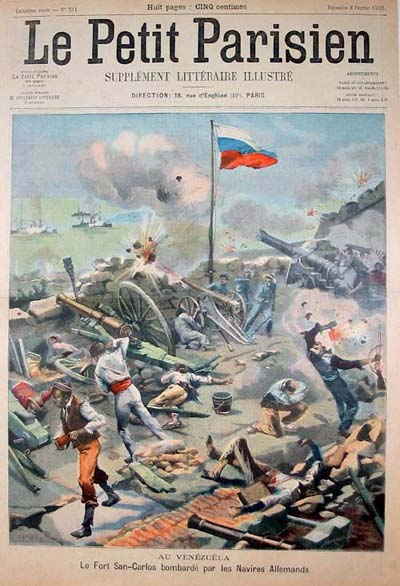
Illustrated literary supplement, January 1903. The inexpensive eight-page color supplement covered world affairs and national politics on the cover, but specializing catastrophes shipwrecks, mining disasters, riots --the more gruesome or gossipy, the better.

The new Third Republic, 1871–1914, was a golden era for French journalism. Newspapers were cheap, energetic, uncensored, omnipresent, and reflected every dimension of political life. The circulation of the daily press combined was only 150,000 in 1860. It reached 1 million in 1870 and 5 million in 1910. In 1914 Paris published 80 daily newspapers. Le Temps was the serious paper of record. Moderates additionally read Le Figaro. Catholics followed La Croix. Nationalists read L'Intransigeant. Socialists (and after 1920 Communists) took direction from "L'Humanité." Much more popular than any of these, and much less political, with nationwide circulation of a million or more came Le Petit Journal, Le Matin, and Le Petit Parisien. The heavy-handed censorship of the First World War, the conscription of journalists, and the severe shortage of newsprint, drastically undercut the size, scope, and quality of all the newspapers.

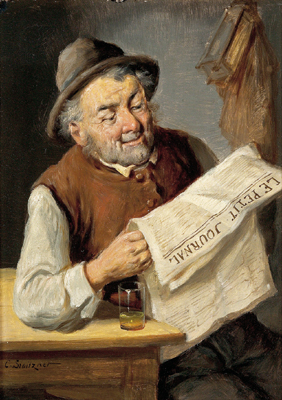
Le Petit Journal, the most popular paper

Advertising grew rapidly, providing a steady financial basis that was more lucrative than single-copy sales. A new liberal press law of 1881 abandoned the restrictive practices that had been typical for a century. New types of popular newspapers, especially Le Petit Journal reached an audience more interested in diverse entertainment and gossip rather than hard news. It captured a quarter of the Parisian market, and forced the rest to lower their prices. In 1884, it added the Supplément illustré, a weekly Sunday supplement that was the first to feature color illustrations. In 1887, it boasted a daily circulation of 950,000, the highest of any newspaper in the world. In 1914. It sold 1.5 million copies a day across France. Most Frenchmen lived in rural areas, and traditionally had minimal access to newspapers. The illustrated popular press revolutionized the rural opportunities for entertaining and colorful news, and helped modernize traditional peasants into Frenchmen.

The main dailies employed their own journalists who competed for news flashes. All newspapers relied upon the Agence Havas (now Agence France-Presse), a telegraphic news service with a network of reporters and contracts with Reuters to provide world service. The staid old papers retained their loyal clientele because of their concentration on serious political issues.

The Roman Catholic Assumptionist order revolutionized pressure group media by its national newspaper La Croix. It vigorously advocated for traditional Catholicism while at the same time innovating with the most modern technology and distribution systems, with regional editions tailored to local taste. Secularists and Republicans recognize the newspaper as their greatest enemy, especially when it took the lead in attacking Dreyfus as a traitor and stirred up anti-Semitism. When Dreyfus was pardoned, the Radical government in 1900 closed down the entire Assumptionist order and its newspaper.

=== Corruption ===
Businesses and banks secretly paid certain newspapers to promote particular financial interests, and hide or cover up possible most behavior. Publishers took payments for favorable notices in news articles of commercial products. Sometimes, a newspaper would blackmail a business by threatening to publish unfavorable information unless the business immediately started advertising in the paper. Foreign governments, especially Russia and Turkey, secretly paid the press hundreds of thousands of francs a year to guarantee favorable coverage of the bonds it was selling in Paris. When the real news was bad about Russia, as during its 1905 Revolution or during its war with Japan, it raised the bribes it paid to millions of francs. Each ministry in Paris had a group of journalists whom it secretly paid and fed stories. During the World War, newspapers became more of a propaganda agency on behalf of the war effort; there was little critical commentary. The press seldom reported the achievements of the Allies; instead they credited all the good news to the French army. In a word, the newspapers were not independent champions of the truth, but secretly paid advertisements for special interests and foreign governments.

=== Stagnation after 1914 ===
Regional newspapers flourished after 1900. However the Parisian newspapers were largely stagnant after the war; circulation inched up to 6 million a day from 5 million in 1910. The major postwar success story was Paris Soir; which lacked any political agenda and was dedicated to providing a mix of sensational reporting to aid circulation, and serious articles to build prestige. By 1939 its circulation was over 1.7 million, double that of its nearest rival the tabloid Le Petit Parisien. In addition to its daily paper Paris Soir sponsored a highly successful women's magazine Marie-Claire. Another magazine Match was modeled after the photojournalism of the American magazine Life.

John Gunther wrote in 1940 that of the more than 100 daily newspapers in Paris, two (L'Humanité and Action Française's publication) were honest; "Most of the others, from top to bottom, have news columns for sale". He reported that Bec et Ongles was simultaneously subsidized by the French government, German government, and Alexandre Stavisky, and that Italy allegedly paid 65 million francs to French newspapers in 1935. France was a democratic society in the 1930s, but the people were kept in the dark about critical issues of foreign policy. The government tightly controlled all of the media to promulgate propaganda to support the government's foreign policy of appeasement to the aggressions of Italy and especially Nazi Germany. There were 253 daily newspapers, all owned separately. The five major national papers based in Paris were all under the control of special interests, especially right-wing political and business interests that supported appeasement. They were all venal, taking large secret subsidies to promote the policies of various special interests. Many leading journalists were secretly on the government payroll. The regional and local newspapers were heavily dependent on government advertising and published news and editorials to suit Paris. Most of the international news was distributed through the Havas agency, which was largely controlled by the government.

== Radio ==
Alternative news sources were likewise tightly controlled. Radio was a potentially powerful new medium, but France was quite laggard in consumer ownership of radio sets, and the government impose very strict controls. After 1938, stations were allowed only three brief daily bulletins, of seven minutes each, to cover all the day's news. The Prime Minister's office closely supervised the news items that were to be broadcast. Newsreels were tightly censored; they were told to feature non-controversial but glamorous entertainers, film premieres, sporting events, high-fashion, new automobiles, an official ceremonies. Motion pictures likely likewise were censored, and were encouraged to reinforce stereotypes to the effect that the French were always lovers of liberty and justice, contending against cruel and barbarous Germans. The government-subsidized films that glorified military virtues and the French Empire. The goal was to tranquilize public opinion, to give it little or nothing to work with, so as not to interfere with the policies of the national government. When serious crises emerged such as the Munich crisis of 1938, people were puzzled and mystified by what was going on. When war came in 1939, Frenchman had little understanding of the issues, and little correct information. They suspiciously distrusted the government, with the result that French morale in the face of the war with Germany was badly prepared.

== Since 1940 ==
The press was heavily censored during the Second World War; the Paris newspapers were under tight German supervision by collaborators; others were closed. In 1944, the Free French liberated Paris, and seized control of all of the collaborationist newspapers. They turned the presses and operations over to new teams of editors and publishers, and provided financial support. As a result, the previously high-prestige Le Temps was replaced by the new daily Le Monde.

During the Fourth Republic from 1944 to 1958, Le Figaro was in effect the official organ of the foreign ministry. French radio and television was under government ownership and strict supervision. Under the Fifth Republic, radio and television remained under strict control of the national government. Newspapers provided limited news of international affairs, and had little influence on government decisions.

In the early 21st century, the best-selling daily was the regional Ouest-France in 47 local editions, followed by Le Progres of Lyon, La Voix du Nord in Lille, and Provençal in Marseille. In Paris the Communists published l'Humanité while Le Monde and Le Figaro had local rivals in Le Parisien, L'Aurore and the leftist Libération.

== See also ==
- History of journalism § France
- List of newspapers in France
- Magazine § France
- Media of France
- Office de Radiodiffusion Télévision Française, radio and TV
