= La Liberté (France) =

French newspaper

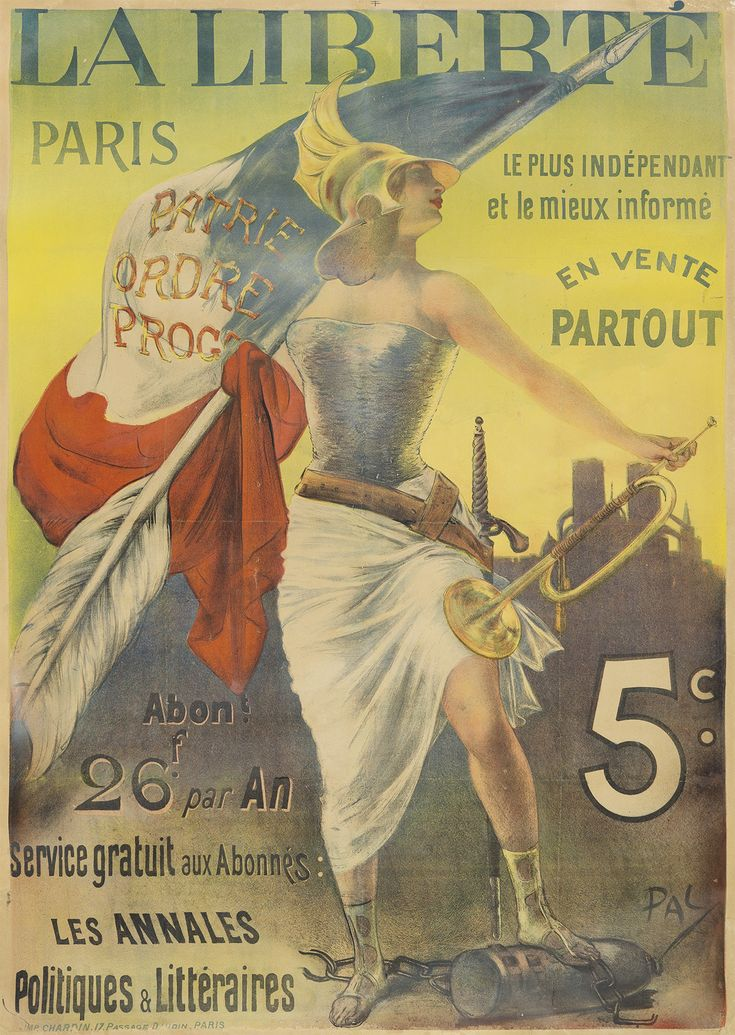
Advertising poster for La Liberté (1898)

La Liberté (French pronunciation: [la libɛʁte], lit. 'The Liberty') was a French Legitimist newspaper created in July 1865 by Charles-François-Xavier Müller and sold in 1866 to Émile de Girardin. Its last issue was published in 1940.

== Editors ==
- 1866–1870 : Émile de Girardin;
- 1870–1876 : Léonce Détroyat;
- 1876–1889 : Louis Gal;
- 1893–1898 : Jules Franck;
- 1898–1911 : Georges Berthoulat;
- 1922–1933 : Camille Aymard;
- 1934–1936 : Désiré Ferry;
- 1937–1940 : Jacques Doriot.
