= Georges Berthoulat =

French politician (1859–1930)

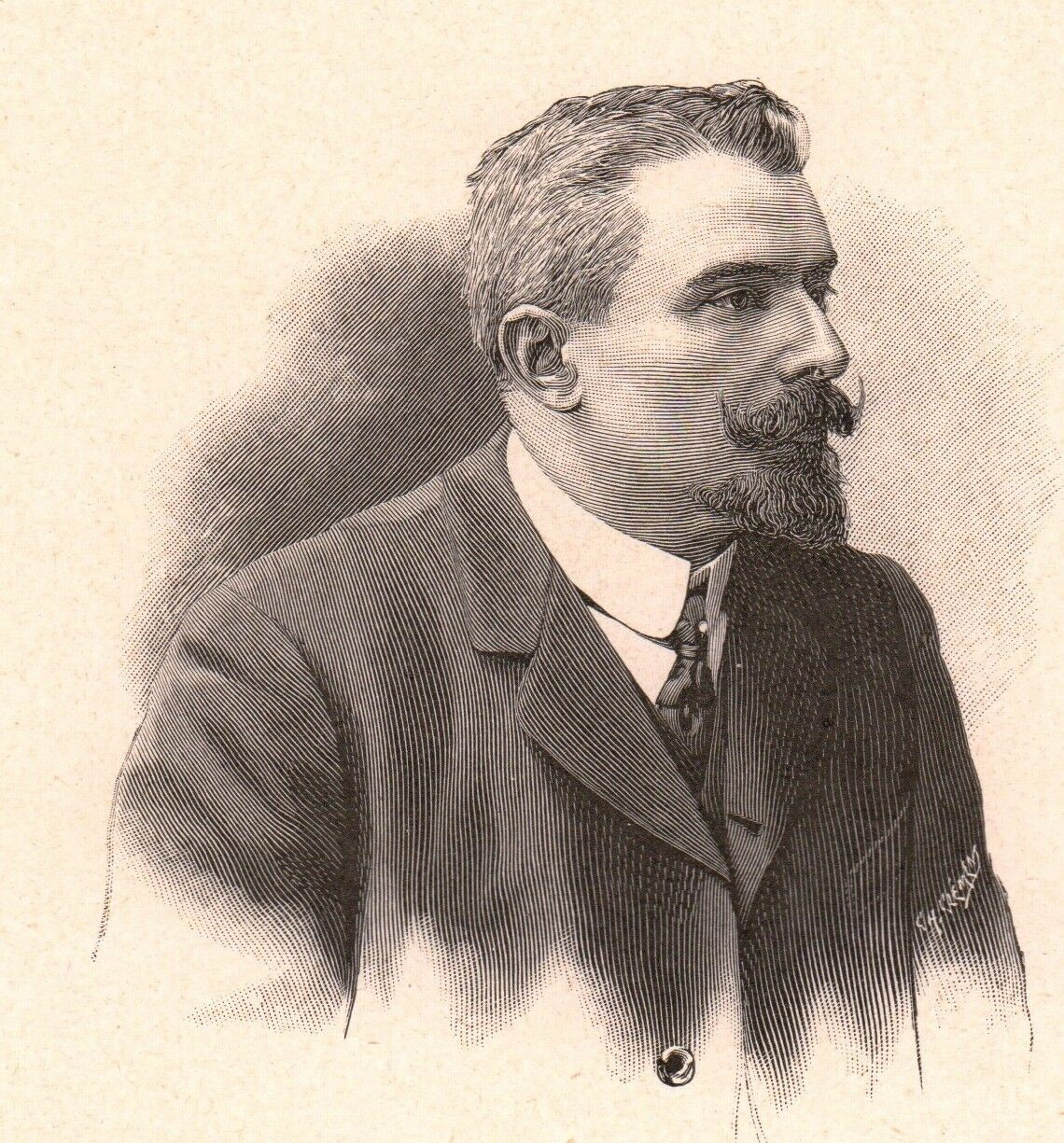
- Georges Berthoulat, portrait engraved in the Album Mariani.

Member of Parliament (France)

Senator of the French Third Republic

Personal details
- Born: 16 August 1859 Le Châtelet, Cher, France
- Died: 5 July 1930 (aged 70) Paris, France
- Occupation: Politician; journalist
- Awards: Chevalier of the Légion d'honneur

Georges Berthoulat (16 August 1859 – 5 July 1930) was a French politician.

After studying law, he became chief of staff to the prefect of Cher, and then, in 1885, secretary general of the department of Cantal. In 1888, he resigned to take up journalism, first at Le Progrès in Lyon, then at the newspaper La Liberté in Paris.

Member of Parliament for Seine-et-Oise from 1902 to 1906, he joined the colonial group and was an opponent of "Dreyfusard radicalism" and the policy of Émile Combes. He was one of the speakers who opposed the law separating church and state in 1905. Defeated in the 1906 elections, he was elected senator for Seine-et-Oise in 1920 and joined the group of the Republican Union. Berthoulat remained in the Senate until his death after surgery in 1930.

== Bibliography ==
- "Georges, Pierre, Louis, Félix Berthoulat" (in French). Assemblée nationale. 2019.
