= Hortense Allart =

French-Italian writer and feminist (1801–1879)

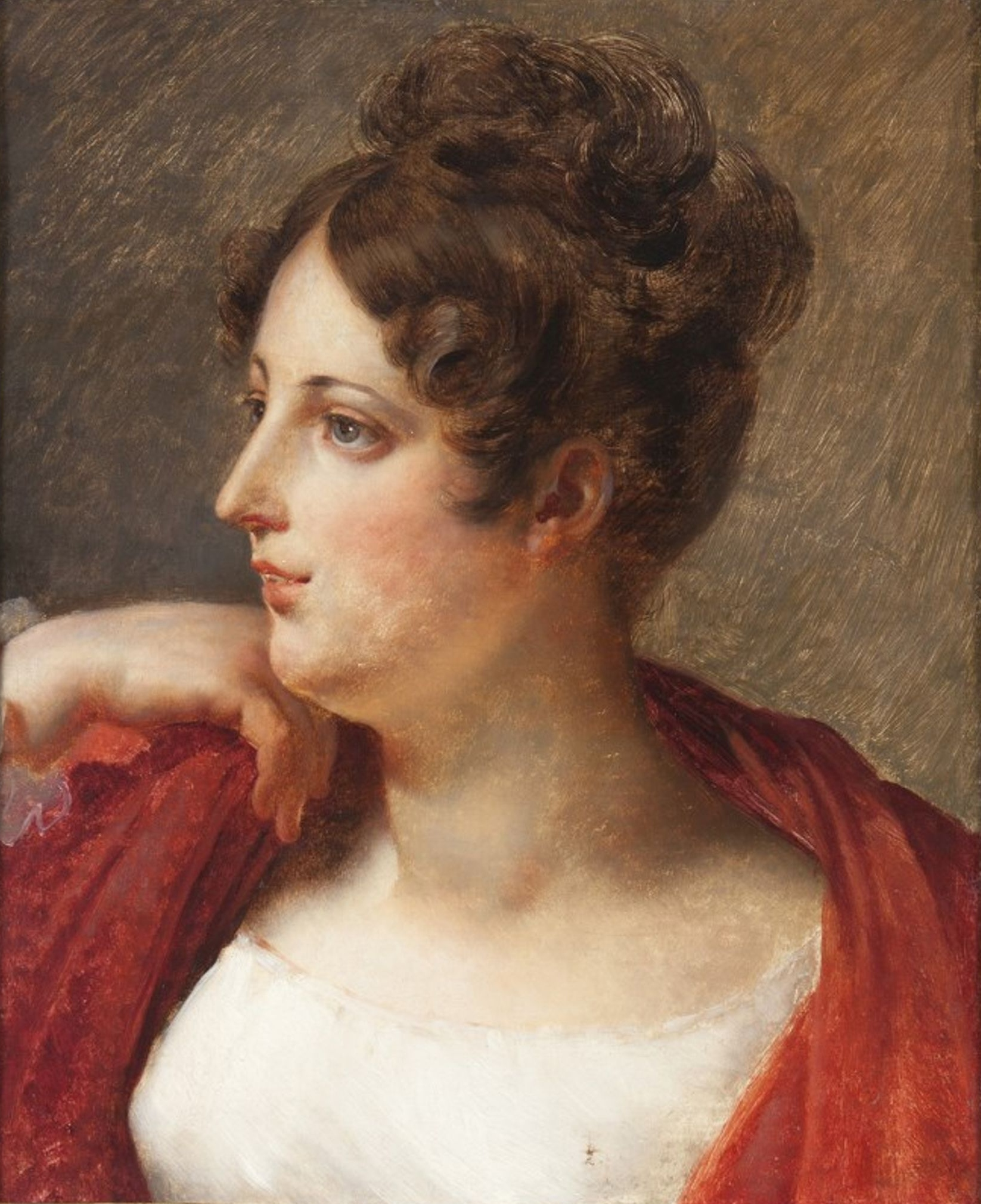
- Portrait of Hortense Allart, painted by her sister Sophie Allart, Roma, 1829 (Châtenay-Malabry, Maison de Chateaubriand (Vallée-aux-Loups)
- Born: Hortense-Térèse-Sigismonde-Sophie Alexandrine Allart; 7 September 1801; Milan, Cisalpine Republic
- Died: 28 February 1879 (aged 77); Montlhéry, France
- Resting place: Bourg-la-Reine, France
- Writing career
- Pen name: Prudence de Saman L'Esbatx

Hortense Allart de Méritens (French pronunciation: [ɔʁtɑ̃s alaʁ]; pseudonym Prudence de Saman L'Esbatx; 7 September 1801 – 28 February 1879) was an Italian-French feminist writer and essayist. Her novels, based on her adventures, did not have much success, except for Les enchantements de Prudence, Avec George Sand ("The Enchantment of Prudence, with George Sand") (1873), which had a succès de scandale.

== Early years and education ==
Allart was born in Milan in 1801. Her French father was Nicolas-Jean-Gabriel Allart and her French mother was the writer Marie-Françoise Gay who had translated the works of the English gothic author Ann Radcliffe. Her maternal aunt was the writer Sophie Gay and her cousin was Delphine de Girardin. In 1817, her father died. She had received what was considered to be a good education.

== Career ==
Allart was an enthusiastic supporter of the vanquished Napoleon and in 1819, she wrote to Henri Gatien Bertrand and volunteered to travel to Saint Helena to nurse the ex-emperor who was ill. Bertrand later offered her a job as a governess and commented that he thought that Napoleon would have fallen in love with her if she had been successful in travelling to be his nurse. Napoleon and her mother died, leaving her an orphan at the age of 20. For some two years, she worked as a governess in the household of General Bertrand, where she met the Comte de Sampayo, a Portuguese gentleman. She became his mistress, and in 1826, gave birth to his son, Marcus. Sampayo abandoned her before she gave birth.

Allart's first work was published in 1821. At this time, she was living with the Countess Regnault de Saint-Jean d'Angely, who became a close friend when she confessed to also wanting to go and tend to the ailing Napoleon. The Countess introduced Allart to two suitors: the economist Hippolyte Passy and the poet Pierre-Jean de Béranger. Beranger and Passy were to be life-long friends. Allart traveled to Florence, where, after a time, she appears to have had an affair with Gino Capponi, who had been interested in a book entitled La Conjuration d'Amboise, which she had published when she was 21. Another early work of hers was a volume of Letters to George Sand, with whose moral and religious principles she much sympathised, and who, later on, pronounced her to be 'one of the glories of her sex'. Allart was a lifelong lover of George Sand, but they had an open relationship. In 1829, Allart was in Rome on a visit to her sister. There, she met François-René de Chateaubriand and they became lovers. Within a few weeks, he proceeded to Paris, and Allart followed him there, taking an apartment in the Rue d’Enfer. In England, she met Henry Bulwer Lytton, afterwards Lord Dalling, and they became lovers, which Allart told Chateaubrian on her return, under notions of probity, and being faithful in her temporary unions. In 1843, she married the French aristocrat Napoléon Louis Frédéric Corneille de Méritens de Malvézie but she left him the following year.

Allart, a notable figure in Paris' intellectual circles, lived several miles outside Paris with her books which she called her "true lovers". She did not recommend that women should abandon men, in fact in her novel Settimia her heroine enjoys her male lovers but is not defined by them but by her lack of interdependence, her intellectual maturity and her children. This was the life that Allart lived, surviving without having to rely on a supportive family. She argued that women needed political reform of their lot and if this meant that women needed to abandon the two-parent family then this would be acceptable. Allart foresaw a world where society was not democratic or organised by men, but a meritocratic society run by women and men of higher abilities than the general population. She professed herself a Protestant, and had a kind of religiosity, however hazy; Allart was loyal, generous and true to her lovers, who usually became her friends. A single mother of two sons, Allart wrote that her sons were not accidents and this was the life she had chosen.

Allart recorded her adventures in her books, veiling them only slightly as fiction. Her novel Jerome (1829), for example, is a thinly disguised account of her experiences with Sampayo, whom she portrayed in the book as a celibate Roman prelate. With the exception of Les enchantements de Prudence, Avec George Sand (1873), which had a succès de scandale, none of her novels had much success.

Allart died in Montlhéry in 1879 and is buried in the cemetery at Bourg-la-Reine.

== Selected works ==
- Essai sur la religion intérieure, Paris, 1824
- Lettres sur les ouvrages de Madame de Staël, Paris, Bossange, 1824
- Gertrude, Paris, Dupont, 1828
- Jerome ou Le jeune prélat, 1829
- Sextus, ou le Romain des Maremmes; suivi d'Essais détachés sur l'Italie, Heideloff et Campe, 1832
- L'indienne, C. Vimont, 1833
- Settimia, Bruxelles, A. Wahlen, 1836
- La femme et la démocratie de nos temps, Paris, Delaunay et Pinard, 1836
- Histoire de la république de Florence, Paris, Delloye, 1843
- Études diverses, Volumes 1 2 & 3, Renault, 1850–1851
- Novum organum ou sainteté philosophique, Paris, Garnier frères, 1857
- Essai sur l’histoire politique depuis l'invasion des barbares jusqu’en 1848, 1857
- Clémence, impr. de E. Dépée (Sceaux), 1865
- Les enchantements de Prudence, Avec George Sand, Paris, Michel Lévy frères, 1873
- Les nouveaux enchantements, Paris, C. Lévy, 1873
- Derniers enchantements, Paris, M. Lévy, 1874
- Lettres inédites à Sainte-Beuve (1841–1848) avec une introduction des notes, Éd. Léon Séché, Paris, Société du Mercure de France, 1908
- Lettere inedite a Gino Capponi, Genova, Tolozzi, 1961
- Mémoires de H.L.B. Henry Lytton Bulwer, Houston : University of Houston, 1960–1969
- Nouvelles lettres à Sainte-Beuve, 1832–1864; les lettres de la collection Lovenjoul, Genève, Librairie Droz, 1965

Source: Uffenbeck, L. A. (1957), The life and writings of Hortense Allart, University of Wisconsin
