= Delphine de Girardin =

French writer (1804–1855)

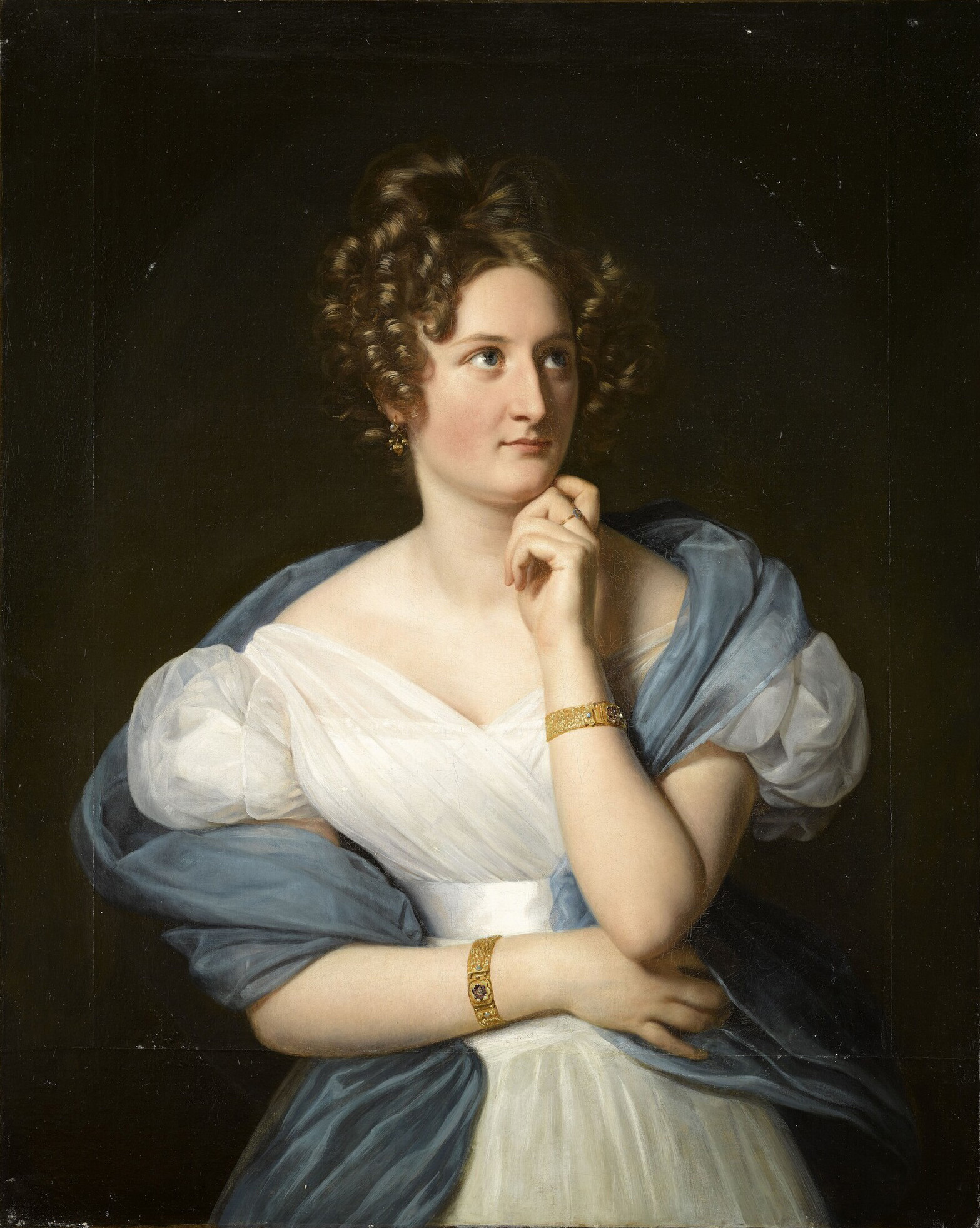
- Born: Delphine Gay; 24 January 1804; Aachen, French Empire
- Died: 29 June 1855 (aged 51); Paris, French Empire
- Occupation: Writer
- Spouse: Émile de Girardin
- Relatives: Sophie Gay (mother); Hortense Allart (cousin)
- Writing career
- Language: French

Delphine de Girardin (24 January 1804 – 29 June 1855; brth name: Delphine Gay pen names: Vicomte Delaunay, Charles de Launay), was a French writer.

== Life ==
De Girardin was born in Aachen, and christened Delphine Gay. Her mother, the well-known Madame Sophie Gay, brought her up in the midst of a brilliant literary society. Her cousin was the writer Hortense Allart. Gay published two volumes of miscellanea, Essais poetiques (1824) and Nouveaux Essais poétiques (1825). A visit to Italy in 1827, during which she was enthusiastically welcomed by the literati of Rome and even crowned in the capitol, produced various poems, of which the most ambitious was Napoline (1833).

Gay's marriage in 1831 to Émile de Girardin opened up a new literary career. The contemporary sketches that she contributed from 1836 to 1839 to the La Presse, under the pen name of Charles de Launay, were collected under the title Lettres parisiennes (1843), and obtained a brilliant success. Contes d'une vieille fille a ses neveux (1832), La Canne de Monsieur de Balzac (1836) and Il ne faut pas jouer avec la douleur (1853) are among the best-known of her romances; and her dramatic pieces in prose and verse include L'École des journalistes (1840), Judith (1843), Cléopâtre (1847), Lady Tartuffe (1853), and the one-act comedies, C'est la faute du mari (1851), La Joie fait peur (1854), Le Chapeau d'un horloger (1854) and Une Femme qui deteste son mari, which did not appear till after the author's death, which occurred in Paris.

Madame Girardin exercised considerable personal influence in contemporary literary society, and in her drawing-room were often to be found Théophile Gautier, Honoré de Balzac, Alfred de Musset and Victor Hugo. She frequently held spiritualist seances, known also to be attended by Victor Hugo and members of his family. Her collected works were published in six volumes (1860-1861).

== Sources ==
- which in turn cites:
  - Sainte-Beuve, Causeries du lundi, t. iii.
  - G. de Molenes, "Les Femmes poètes," in Revue des deux mondes (July 1842)
  - Taxile Delord, Les Matinées littéraires (1860); L'Esprit de Madame Girardin, avec une préface par M. Lamartine (1862)
  - G. d'Heilly, Madame de Girardin, sa vie et ses œuvres (1868)
  - Imbert de Saint Amand, Mme de Girardin (1875)
