= Émile de Girardin =

19th-century French politician and journalist

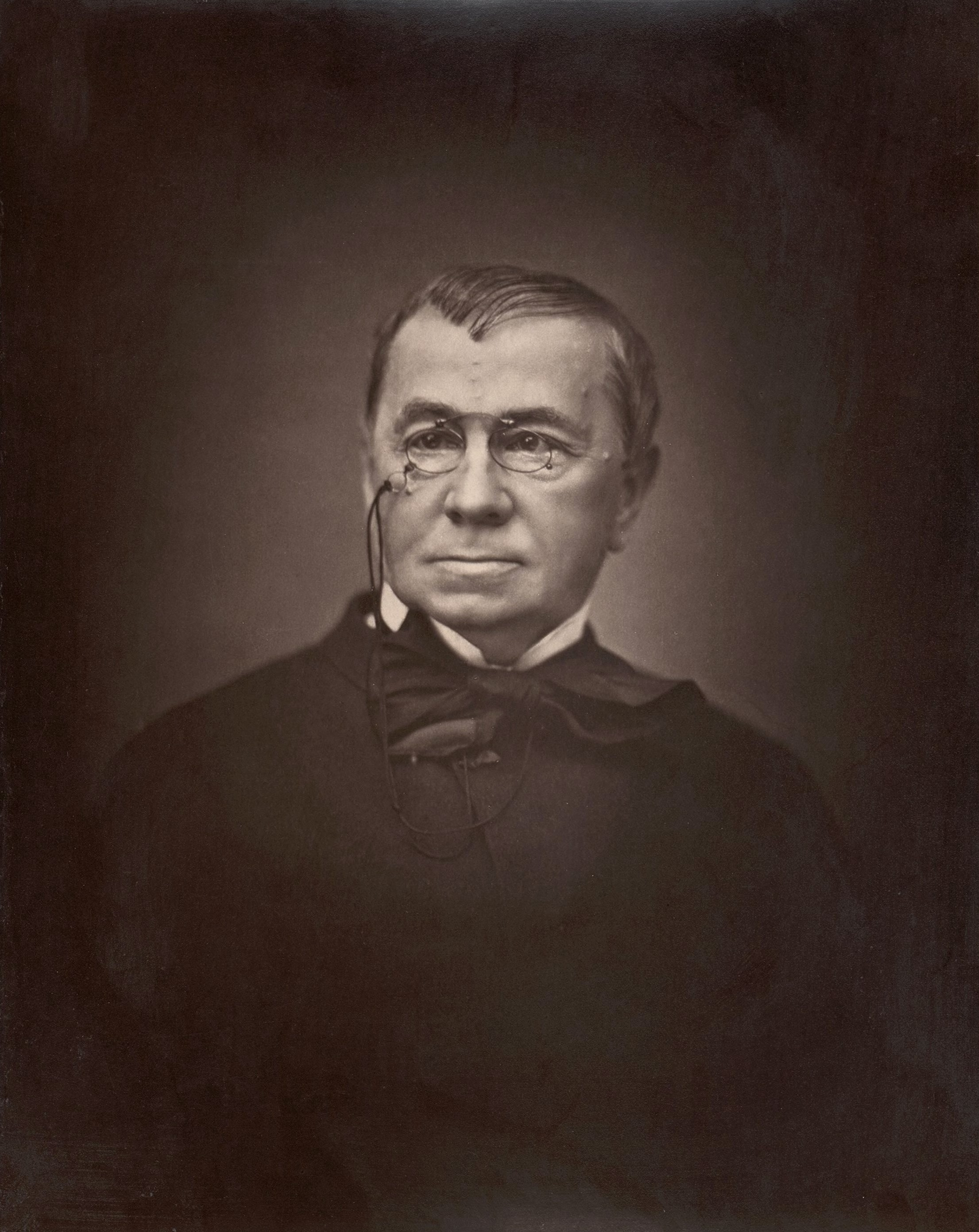
- Photograph of Girardin (1876)

Member of the Chamber of Deputies for Seine
- In office 7 November 1877 – 27 April 1881
- Preceded by: Jules Simon
- Succeeded by: Severiano de Heredia
- Constituency: Paris (9th)

Member of the Chamber of Deputies for Bas-Rhin
- In office 1850 – 2 December 1851
- Preceded by: Gustave Goldenberg
- Succeeded by: Constituency abolished
- Constituency: Molsheim

Member of the Chamber of Deputies for Tarn-et-Garonne
- In office 10 July 1842 – 16 July 1846
- Preceded by: Bertrand Faure-d'Ère
- Succeeded by: Jean-Pierre Bourjade
- Constituency: Castelsarrasin

Member of the Chamber of Deputies for Creuse
- In office 17 August 1846 – 24 February 1848
- Preceded by: Louis-Jean-Henry Aubusson de Soubrebost
- Succeeded by: Joseph-Edmond Fayolle
- Constituency: Bourganeuf
- In office 22 June 1834 – 9 July 1842
- Preceded by: Adolphe Bourgeois
- Succeeded by: Antoine Regnauld
- Constituency: Genouillac

Personal details
- Born: 22 June 1802 Paris, Seine, France
- Died: 27 April 1881 (aged 78) Paris, Seine, France
- Party: Resistance Party (1834–1842); Movement Party (1842–1848); Moderate (1850–1851); Left Republican (1877–1881)
- Spouses: Delphine Gay (m. 1831; died 1855) Wilhelmine Brunold, Gräfin von Tiefenbach (m. 1856; div. 1872)
- Profession: Journalist, writer, publisher

Émile de Girardin (French pronunciation: [emil də ʒiʁaʁdɛ̃]; 22 June 1802 – 27 April 1881) was a French journalist, publisher and politician. He was the most successful and flamboyant French journalist of the era, presenting himself as a promoter of mass education through mass journalism. His magazines reached over a hundred thousand subscribers, and his inexpensive daily newspaper La Presse undersold the competition by half, thanks to its cheaper production and heavier advertising. Like most prominent journalists, Girardin was deeply involved in politics, and served in parliament. To his bitter disappointment, he never held high office. He was a brilliant polemicist, a master of controversy, with pungent short sentences that immediately caught the reader's attention.

== Biography ==
=== Early life and career ===
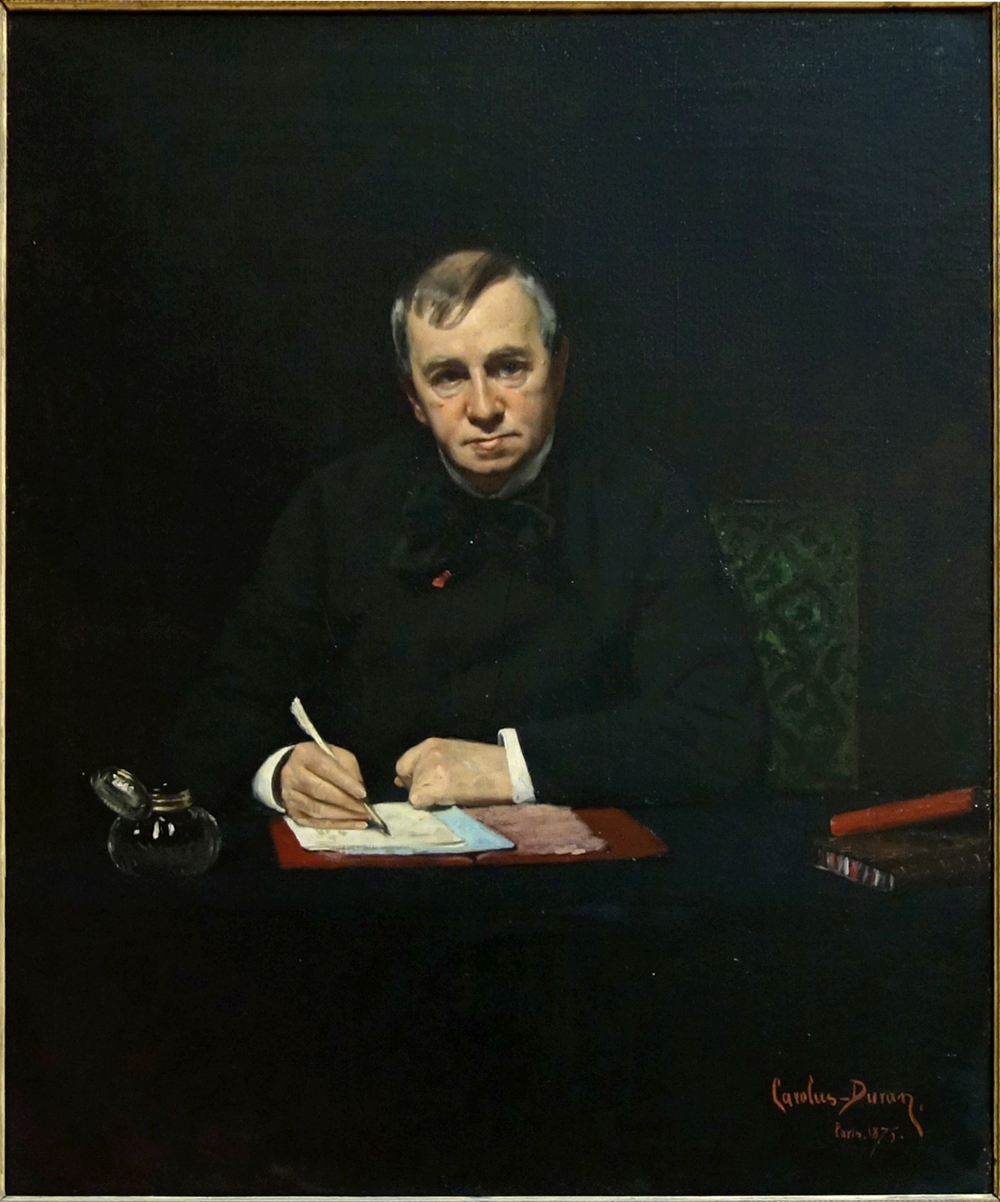
Portrait of Girardin by Carolus-Duran (1876)

Girardin was born in Paris, the bastard son of General Alexandre de Girardin and of his mistress Madame Dupuy (née Fagnan), wife of a Parisian advocate.

His first publication was a novel, Émile, dealing with his birth and early life, and appeared under the name of Girardin in 1827. He became inspector of fine arts under the Martignac ministry just before the revolution of 1830, and was an energetic and passionate journalist. Besides his work on the daily press he issued miscellaneous publications which attained an enormous circulation. His Journal des connaissances utiles had 120,000 subscribers, and the initial edition of his Almanach de France (1834) ran to a million copies. He founded the illustrated literary magazine Musée des familles in 1833.

In 1836 he inaugurated penny press journalism in a popular conservative organ, La Presse, the subscription to which was only forty francs a year. It was the first newspaper anywhere to rely on paid advertising to lower its price, extend its readership and increase its profitability and the formula was soon copied by all titles. This undertaking involved him in a duel with Armand Carrel, the fatal result of which made him refuse satisfaction to later opponents. In 1839 he was excluded from the Chamber of Deputies, to which he had been elected four times, on the plea of his foreign birth, but was admitted in 1842. He resigned early in February 1847, and on 24 February 1848 sent a note to Louis Philippe demanding his resignation and the regency of the duchess of Orléans.

=== Political career ===
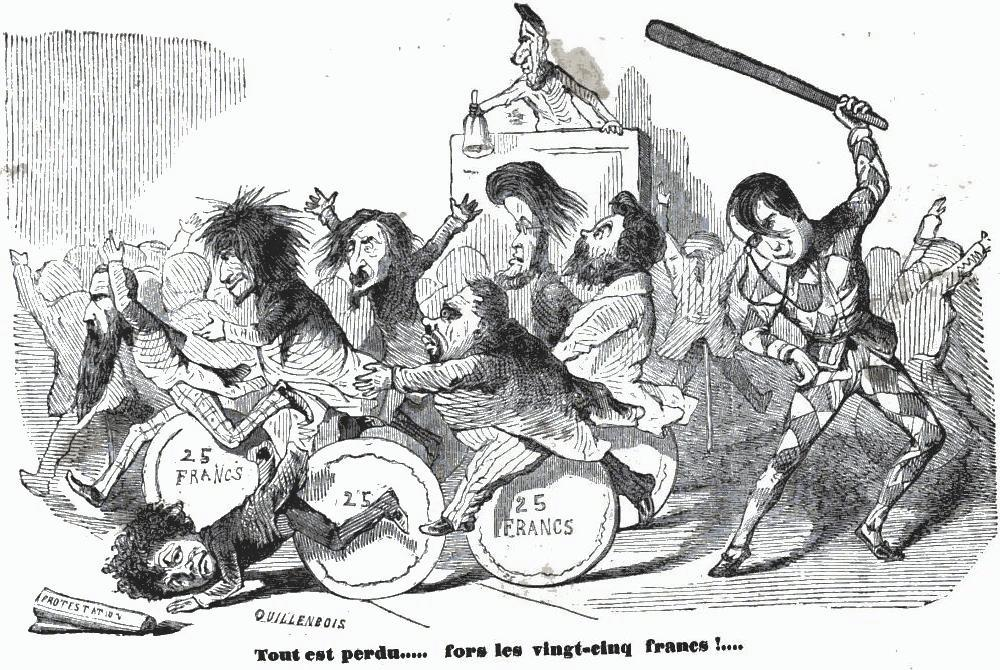
Satirical cartoon on parliamentarians. Girardin is the stick-brandishing figure dressed as Harlequin

In the Legislative Assembly he voted with the Mountain. In 1850, Girardin wrote an article called Le Socialisme et l'Impot. In his article, Girardin suggested that there was a "good" socialism and a "bad" socialism. This article was reviewed by Karl Marx and Friedrich Engels in a jointly written article carried in their newspaper Neue Rheinisch Zeitung Politisch-Ökonomische Revue No. 4. Giradin defined "good socialism" as promoting harmony between capital and labor, while "bad socialism" promoted war between capital and labor. Marx and Engels criticized Girardin's theory of good socialism as not being socialism at all. Girardin's "good socialism" actually ignored workers in society and concluded that society was composed exclusively of capitalists.

Later, Girardin pressed eagerly in his paper for the election of Prince Louis Napoleon, of whom he afterwards became one of the most violent opponents. In 1856 he sold La Presse, only to resume it in 1862, but its vogue was over, and Girardin started a new journal, La Liberté, the sale of which was forbidden in the public streets. He supported Émile Ollivier and the Liberal Empire, but plunged into vehement journalism again to advocate war against Prussia.

=== Final years ===
Of his many subsequent enterprises the most successful was the purchase of Le Petit Journal, which served to advocate the policy of Adolphe Thiers, though he himself did not contribute. The crisis of 16 May 1877, when Jules Simon fell from power, made him resume his pen to attack MacMahon and the party of reaction in La France and in Le Petit Journal. Émile de Girardin married in 1831 Delphine Gay, and after her death in 1855 Guillemette Josephine Brunold, countess von Tieffenbach, morganatic granddaughter of Prince Frederick of Nassau. He was divorced from his second wife in 1872. He died in Paris.

== Selected works ==
The long list of his social and political writings includes:

- De la presse périodique au XIXe siècle (1837)
- De l'instruction publique (1838)
- Études politiques (1838)
- De la liberté de la presse et du journalisme (1842)
- Le Droit au travail au Luxembourg et à l'Assemblée Nationale (2 vols, 1848)
- Les Cinquante-deux (1849, etc.), a series of articles on current parliamentary questions
- La Politique universelle, décrets de l'avenir (Brussels, 1852)
- Le Condamné du 6 mars (1867), an account of his own differences with the government in 1867 when he was fined 5000 fr. for an article in La Liberté
- Le Dossier de la guerre (1877), a collection of official documents
- Questions de mon temps, 1836 à 1846, articles extracted from the daily and weekly press (12 vols., 1858).

== See also ==
- History of French journalism
