= La Presse (French newspaper) =

Defunct French newspaper

- Type: Penny press newspaper
- Founder: Émile de Girardin
- Founded: June 16, 1836
- Language: French
- Headquarters: France

La Presse was the first penny press newspaper in France.

== Overview ==
La Presse was founded on 16 June 1836 by Émile de Girardin as a popular conservative enterprise. While contemporary newspapers depended heavily on subscription and tight party affiliation, La Presse was sold by street vendors. Girardin wanted the paper to support the government, without being so tied to specific cabinets that it would limit the newspaper's readership. The initial subscription to La Presse was only 40 francs a year while other newspapers charged around 80 francs.

From July 1836 it serialised The Countess of Salisbury the first novel of Alexandre Dumas, which was such a success that it followed it up with Honoré de Balzac's La Vieille Fille.

La Presse and Le Siècle are considered the first titles of the industrialized press era in France.

== See also ==
- History of French journalism
