= History of auto racing =

Auto racing began in the late 19th century. It became an organized sport in the early 20th century and has grown in popularity ever since.

== Early motor competition ==
Internal combustion auto racing events began soon after the construction of the first successful gasoline-fuelled automobiles. The first organized contest was on April 28, 1887, by the chief editor of Paris publication Le Vélocipède, Monsieur Fossier. It ran 2 kilometres (1.2 mi) from Neuilly Bridge to the Bois de Boulogne. It was won by Georges Bouton of the De Dion-Bouton Company in a car he had constructed with Albert, the Comte de Dion, but as he was the only competitor to show up, it is difficult to justify it as a race.

Another solo event occurred in 1891 when Auguste Doriot and Louis Rigoulot of Peugeot drove their gasoline-fuelled Type 3 Quadricycle in the bicycle race from Paris–Brest–Paris. By the time they reached Brest, the winning cyclist, Charles Terront, was already back in Paris. In order to publicly prove the reliability and performance of the Quadricycle, Armand Peugeot had persuaded the organiser, Pierre Giffard of Le Petit Journal, to use his network of monitors and marshals to vouchsafe and report the vehicle's performance. The intended distance of 1200 km had never been achieved by a motorised vehicle, it being about three times further than the record set by Leon Serpollet from Paris to Lyon.

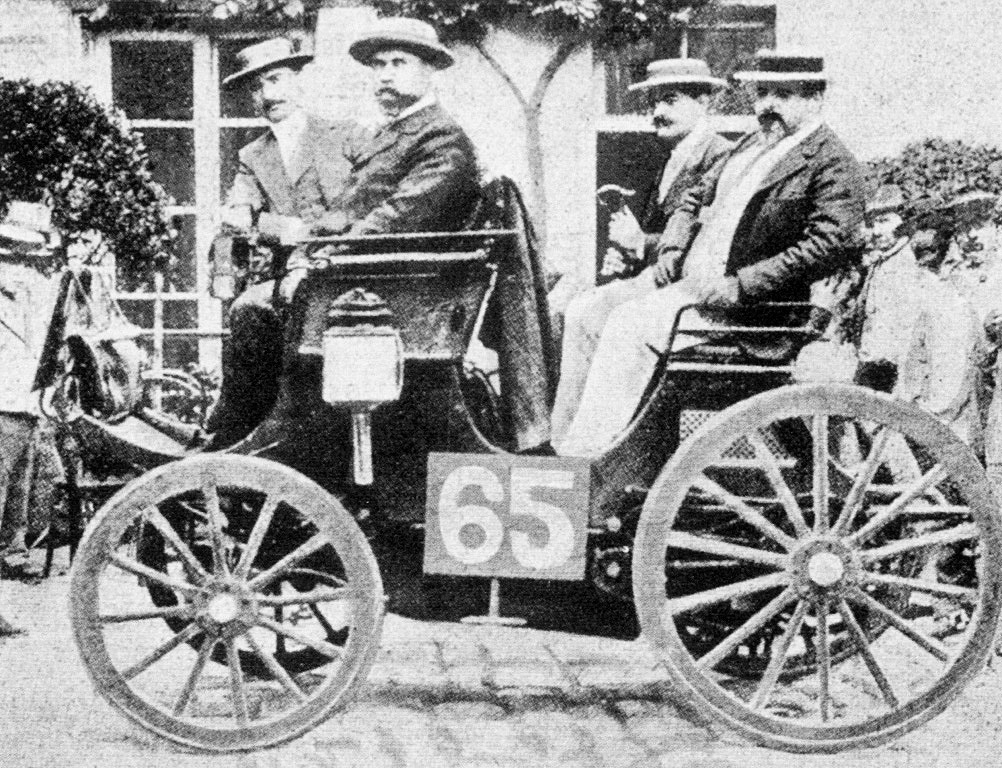
Albert Lemaître classified first in his Peugeot Type 5 3hp in the Paris–Rouen.

=== Paris–Rouen: the world's first motoring contest ===
On 22 July 1894, the Parisian magazine Le Petit Journal organised what is considered to be the world's first motoring competition, from Paris to Rouen. Sporting events were a tried and tested form of publicity stunt and circulation booster. Pierre Giffard, the paper's editor, promoted it as a Concours des Voitures sans Chevaux (Competition for Horseless Carriages) that was "not dangerous, easy to drive, and cheap during the journey." Thus, it blurred the distinctions between a reliability trial, a general event, and a race. One hundred and two competitors paid a 10-franc entrance fee.

Sixty-nine cars started the 50 km (31 mi) selection event that would show which entrants would be allowed to start the main event, the 127 km (79 mi) race from Paris to Rouen. The entrants ranged from serious manufacturers like Peugeot, Panhard, or De Dion to amateur owners; only 25 were selected for the main race.

The race started from Porte Maillot and went through the Bois de Boulogne. Count Jules-Albert de Dion was first into Rouen after 6 hours and 48 minutes at an average speed of 19 km/h. He finished 3'30" ahead of Albert Lemaître (Peugeot), followed by Auguste Doriot (Peugeot) at 16'30", René Panhard (Panhard) at 33'30" and Émile Levassor (Panhard) at 55'30". The official winners were Peugeot and Panhard as cars were judged on their speed, handling and safety characteristics. De Dion's steam car needed a stoker, which was forbidden.

== Early races ==
The Paris–Bordeaux–Paris race of June 1895 has sometimes been described as the "first motor race", despite the 1894 event being decided by speed and finishing order of the eligible racers. The first to arrive was Émile Levassor in his Panhard-Levassor 1205cc model. He completed the course (1,178 km or 732 miles) in 48 hours and 47 minutes, finishing nearly six hours before the runner-up. The official winner was Paul Koechlin in a Peugeot. Nine of twenty-two starters finished the course.

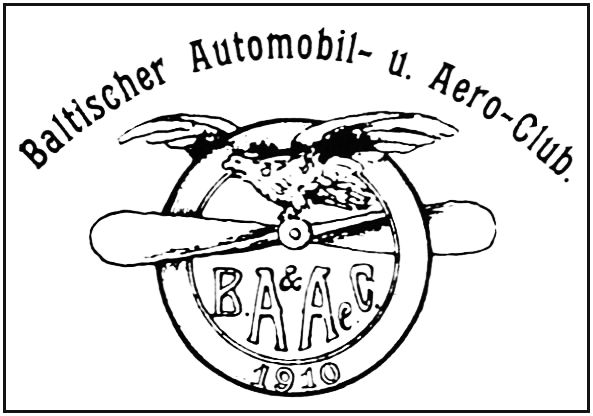
The Baltic Automobile & Aero Club

Racing in the Russian Empire began in October 1898, south west of St Petersburg along the straight Volkhonskoye Shosse (highway). The last race of the Russian Empire took place in July 1914 with The Baltic Automobile & Aero Club founded in 1910 in Riga.

The first American automobile race is generally held to be the Thanksgiving Day Chicago Times-Herald race of 28 November 1895. Press coverage of the event first aroused significant American interest in the automobile. The 54.36-mile (87.48 km) course ran from the south side of the city, north along the lakefront to Evanston, Illinois, and back again. Frank Duryea won the race in 7 hours and 53 minutes, beating the other five entrants.

The first regular auto racing venue was Nice, France, run in late March 1897, as a "Speed Week". To fill out the schedule, most types of racing events were invented here, including the first hill climb (Nice – La Turbie) and a sprint that was, in spirit, the first drag race.

An international competition, between nations rather than individuals, began with the Gordon Bennett Cup in auto racing.

The Parisian artist Ernest Montaut and his wife, Marguerite, faithfully documented the rapidly changing face of motorised transportation in Europe. They produced large numbers of posters and prints published by Mabileau et Cie, covering racing events involving motorcars, aircraft, dirigibles and speedboats. These images formed a valuable contribution to the history of transport, and particularly to its racing aspect.

== City-to-city racing ==
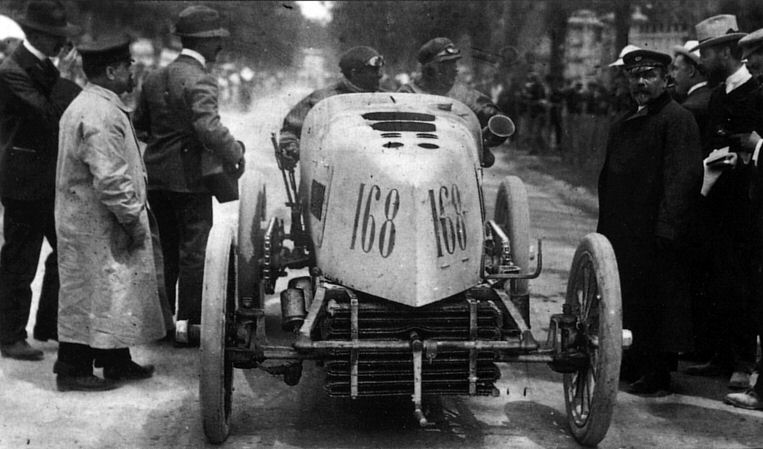
Fernand Gabriel driving a Mors in Paris-Madrid 1903

With auto construction and racing dominated by the country, many of the first car racing events occurred in France. One of the earliest examples was Pau - Tarbes - Bayonne - Pau (then called the Circuit du Sud-Ouest, 300km) race held in 1900. Subsequently, French Automobile Club (ACF) staged a number of major international races, usually from or to Paris, connecting with another major city, in France or elsewhere in Europe.

The early European races ended in 1903, when Marcel Renault was involved in a fatal crash near Angoulême in the Paris–Madrid race. Eight fatalities during the first leg caused the French government to stop the race in Bordeaux, leading to a ban on open-road racing.

In 1907, the Peking to Paris race covered 9,317 miles over some of the roughest terrain on Earth. Five cars took part in the race, which was won by the Italian Prince Scipione Borghese in a 7,433 cc (453.6 cu in) 35/45 hp model Itala.

The longest automobile race in history, with Paris as the finish line, was the 1908 New York to Paris Race. Six teams from France, Italy, Germany, and the United States competed with three teams actually reaching Paris. The American Thomas Flyer driven by George Schuster was declared the winner of the epic 22,000 mile race in 169 days

== The first purpose-built racing circuits ==
The Circuit de Pau-Ville in France, is the world's first motor racing circuit for automobiles, hosting Semaine de Pau (Week in Pau) in 1901.

Aspendale Racecourse, in Australia, was the site of the world's first purpose-built motor racing circuit, opening in January 1906. The pear shaped track was close to a mile in length, with slightly banked curves and a gravel surface of crushed cement. The circuit was built inside of the horse racing track which was opened 15 years prior.

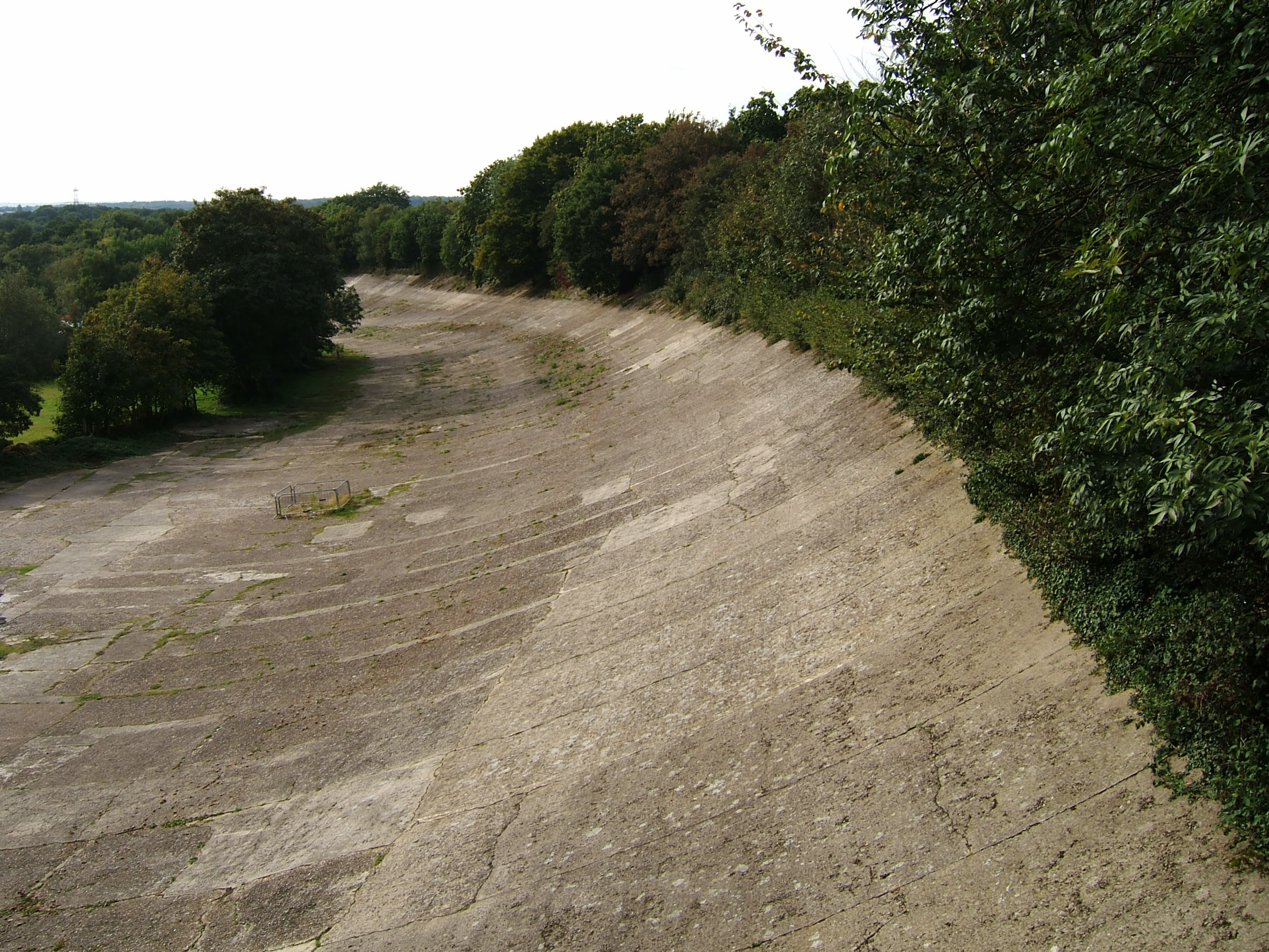
A remaining section of the Brooklands track in 2007

Brooklands, in Surrey, was the first purpose-built 'banked' motor racing venue, opening in June 1907. It featured a 4.43 km (2.75 mi) concrete track with high-speed banked corners. Brooklands was also a centre of the aviation industry, with Vickers setting up a factory and aerodrome there during World War I. The racing circuit was closed in 1939 as war-time aircraft production took over. Damage done to the track during World War II meant the track never reopened for racing.

The Milwaukee Mile is the second-oldest motor racing track in the world still in existence, with racing being held there since 1903. It was not purposely built for motor racing, however. It started as a one-mile (1.6 km) horse-racing track in the 19th century. The first closed-circuit automobile race was held on September 7, 1896 at the Narragansett Trotting Park in Cranston, Rhode Island, and was won by an electric car built by the Riker Electric Vehicle Company.

Knoxville Raceway in Knoxville, Iowa, is the oldest racing venue, and one of the most prestigious, in the United States. It was built in the late 1800s at the Marion County Fairgrounds in Iowa. It was built for a horse-racing track, just like the Milwaukee Mile. Although sanctioned races were not held until 1914, one automobile race was held in 1901. The race was not good because of the wind; but in 1961, the first Knoxville Nationals was won by Roy Robbins. Now the Nationals are sanctioned by the World of Outlaws.

From 1903 to 1914, a one-mile dirt oval track was run on Brunots Island, just south of Pittsburgh on the Ohio River. Louis Chevrolet won the AAA Champion car in 1905. On September 10, 1907, Rex Reinersten was fatally injured in a crash there. In 1916, Chevrolet won the first Universal Films Trophy at the mile and an eighth Uniontown Speedway board track, south of Pittsburgh in Hopwood, Pennsylvania.

Competition gradually spread to other parts of the British Empire. The first competition in India was held in 1905 by the Motor Union of Western India. It ran from Delhi to Mumbai, (Delhi–Bombay trials 1905) a distance of 810 miles (1,300 km), in an attempt to expose India to the automobile and test its suitability for Indian conditions. Lord Curzon, the Viceroy, gave his consent to the event.

One of the oldest existing purpose-built automobile racing circuits in the United States, still in use, is the 2.5-mile (4.02 km)-long Indianapolis Motor Speedway in Speedway, Indiana, built from March to August 1909, when it first opened for racing. It is the largest capacity sports venue of any variety worldwide, with a top capacity of some 257,000+ seated spectators. The oldest asphalt-paved oval track in the United States is Thompson Speedway Motorsports Park in Thompson, Connecticut, once known as the "Indianapolis of the East."

== 1906–1950 ==
The Targa Florio was an open road endurance automobile race held in the mountains of Sicily near the island's capital of Palermo. Founded in 1906, it was the oldest sports car racing event, part of the World Sportscar Championship between 1955 and 1973.

In 1911, the Indianapolis 500 was run for the first time. Dubbed the "greatest spectacle in racing", the Indianapolis 500 is one of the oldest continuously held motor races in the world. Together with the 24 Hours of Le Mans, first run in 1923, and the Monaco Grand Prix, first run in 1929, the three events form the Triple Crown of Motorsport. The Triple Crown is often considered the most prestigious feat in all of motorsport and has only been completed once. Driver Graham Hill won the Monaco Grand Prix five times, from 1963 to 1969, the Indianapolis 500 in 1966, and finally the 24 Hours of Le Mans in 1972 on his way to become the first and only Triple Crown winner.

The 1930s saw the transformation from high-priced road cars into pure racers, with Alfa Romeo, Auto Union, Bugatti, Delage, Delahaye, and Mercedes-Benz constructing streamlined vehicles with engines producing up to 450 kW (603 hp), aided by multiple-stage supercharging. From 1928 to 1930 and again in 1934–1936, the maximum weight permitted was 750 kg (1,653 lb), a rule diametrically opposed to current racing regulations. Extensive use of aluminum alloys was required to achieve light weight. NASCAR was founded by Bill France, Sr. on February 21, 1948, with the help of several other drivers of the time. The first NASCAR "Strictly Stock" race ever was held on June 19, 1949, at Daytona Beach, Florida. The Strictly Stock division was put on hold as American automobile manufacturers were unable to produce family sedans quickly enough to keep up with post-World War II demand.

== 1950–present ==
After the Second World War, sports car racing emerged as a distinct form of racing with its own classic races, and, from 1953, its own FIA-sanctioned World Championship. NASCAR's Strictly Stock Division was renamed the "Grand National" division beginning in the 1950 season. Over a period of more than a decade, modifications for both safety and performance were allowed, and by the mid-1960s, the vehicles were purpose-built race cars with a stock-appearing body.

From 1962, sports cars temporarily took a back seat to GT cars, with the FIA replacing the World Championship for Sports Cars with the International Championship for GT Manufacturers. Through the 1960s, as superspeedways were built and old dirt tracks were paved, the number of dirt races was reduced.

A breed of powerful hybrids appeared in the 1950s and 1960s and raced on both sides of the Atlantic, featuring European chassis and large American engines – from the early Allard cars via hybrids, such as Lotus 19s fitted with large engines, through to the AC Cobra. The combination of mostly British chassis and American V8 engines gave rise to the Can-Am series in the 1960s and 1970s. This series, based in the United States and Canada, featured lightweight prototype sports cars fitted with large, powerful production-based engines that produced speeds in excess of 200 mph. Clubmans provided much entertainment at club-racing level from the 1960s into the 1990s, and John Webb revived interest in big sports prototypes with Thundersports in the 1980s. Group 4 Grand Touring Cars and Group 5 Special Production Cars became the premier form of sports car racing from 1976, with prototypes going into a general decline apart from Porsche 936 domination at Le Mans and a lower-key series of races for smaller two-litre Group 6 prototypes. The last NASCAR race on a dirt track was held on September 30, 1970 at the half-mile State Fairgrounds Speedway in Raleigh, North Carolina. From 1972 through 2003, NASCAR's premier series was called the Winston Cup Series, sponsored by R. J. Reynolds Tobacco Company cigarette brand Winston. The changes that resulted from RJR's involvement, as well as the reduction of the schedule from 48 to 31 races a year, established 1972 as the beginning of NASCAR's "modern era".

In Europe, the FIA adopted the ACO GTP rules virtually unchanged and sanctioned the Group C World Endurance Championship (or World Sportscar Championship), featuring high-tech closed-cockpit prototypes. In the US, the IMSA Camel GTP series boasted close competition between huge fields of manufacturer-backed teams and privateer squads – the cars were technically similar to Group Cs but used a sliding scale of weights and engine capacities to try to limit performance. The FIA attempted to make Group C into a virtual "two seater Grand Prix" format in the early 1990s, with engine rules in common with F1, short race distances, and a schedule dovetailing with that of the F1 rounds. The IMSA GT Championship had been prototype-based since 1983, with less emphasis on production cars. Australian Production Car Championship was first contested in 1987, with the inaugural champion determined from the results of two races held at the Winton Motor Raceway in Victoria on 27 September. The first World Touring Car Championship, which was open to Group A Touring Cars, was held in 1987 concurrent to the long-running European Touring Car Championship (ETCC). Additional rounds were held outside Europe at Bathurst in Australia, Calder Park Raceway in Australia (using both the road course and the then-newly constructed Thunderdome), Wellington in New Zealand and Mount Fuji in Japan. The Drivers Championship was won by Roberto Ravaglia in a BMW M3, and the Entrants Championship was won by the Eggenberger Motorsport Ford No 7 entry, which was a Ford Sierra. Winston Cup Series underwent a large boom in popularity in the 1990s. This coincided with a decline of popularity in American Championship Car Racing. The FISA decided to separate the rally cars into three classes: Group N (production cars), Group A (modified production cars), and Group B (modified sport cars). Group B was introduced by the FIA in 1982 as a replacement for both Group 4 (modified grand touring) and Group 5 (touring prototype) cars.

The IMSA GT Series evolved into the American Le Mans Series, which ran its first season in 1999. The European races eventually became the closely related Le Mans Series, both of which mix prototypes and GTs. The SCCA World Challenge consists of a one-hour race for each round, combining three classes: GT (Chevrolet Corvette, Aston Martin DB9, etc.), "GTS" (Acura TSX, BMW 3 Series, etc.; replaced the former touring car class), and Touring Car (a "showroom stock" class similar to Grand Am's Continental Challenge). NASCAR was becoming increasingly dominant, and the IndyCar Series' split from CART in 1996 put more emphasis on ovals regarding domestic open-wheel racing.

== See also ==
- History of the automobile
- The Last Motor Race of The Empire
