= La Marquise =

World's oldest running automobile

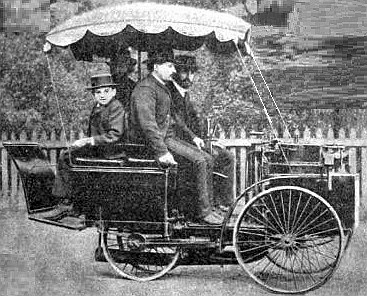
Georges Bouton driving La Marquise, c.1885

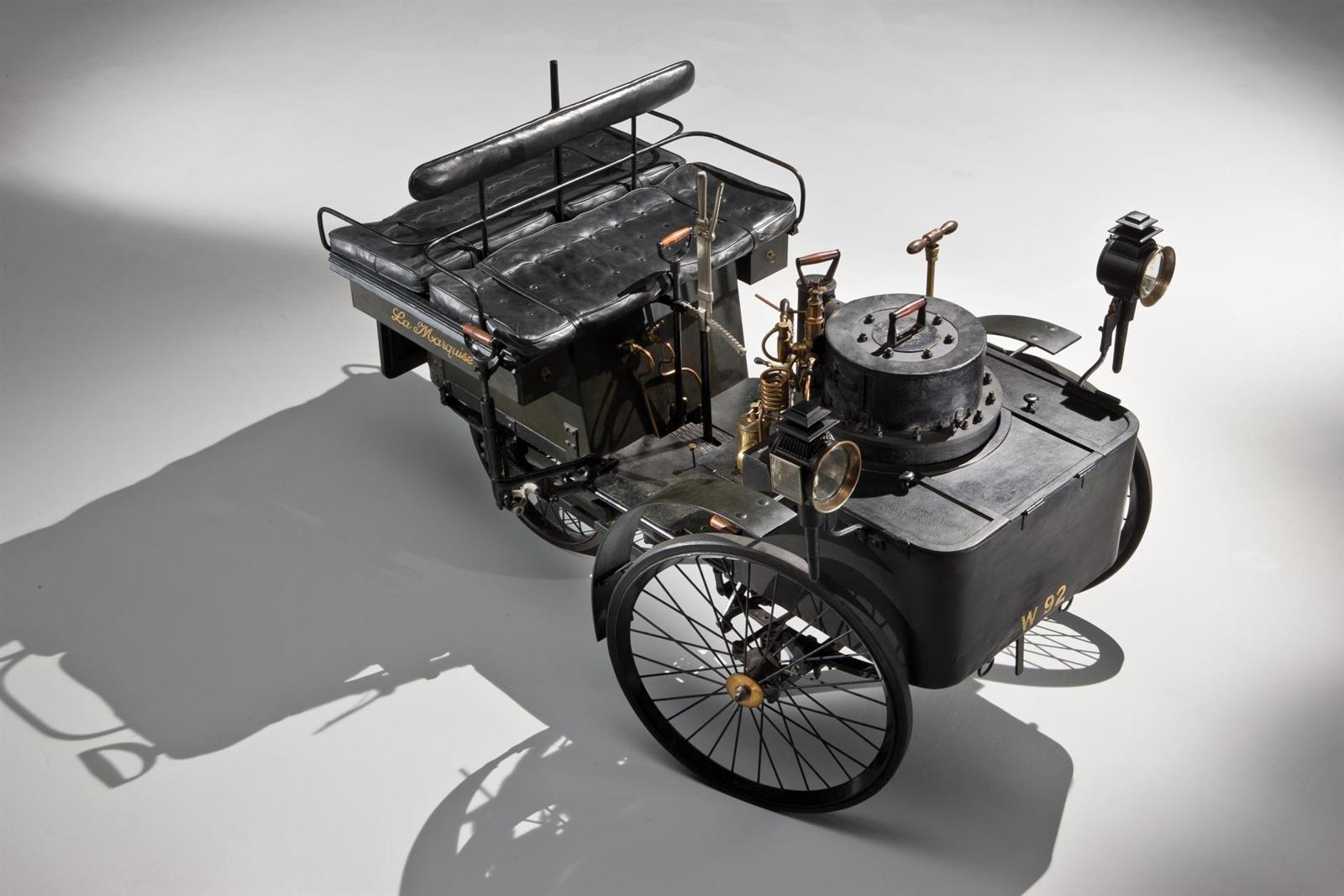
La Marquise, 2021

La Marquise ([la maʁkiz], "The Marchioness") has been claimed the world's oldest running automobile, as of 2011, but the Grenville steam carriage of 1875-80 is older and still in running order. It was made in 1884 or 1885 by the French company De Dion, Bouton & Trépardoux, (later De Dion-Bouton) financed and led by Count de Dion.

The car was one of a series of prototype quadricycles and tricycles which de Dion built from 1883 - 1888. The name is not contemporary: it is referred to as "Tricycle à Vapeur (1885)" (Steam tricycle) in Pierre Souvestre's Histoire de l'Automobile (1907) and "Steam Quadricycle (1885)" in H.O.Duncan's The World on Wheels (1926).

In 1887, the magazine le Vélo organised a race from Paris-to-Versailles and back (20 miles; 32 km). La Marquise was the only vehicle which took part. It made the round trip at an average speed of 25.5 km/h (15.8 mph; 7.1 m/s). The following year, de Dion beat Bouton in a three-wheeler with an average speed of 29 km/h (18 mph; 8.1 m/s).

Fueled by coal, wood and pieces of paper, the car takes 30–40 minutes to build up enough steam to drive. Her top speed is 61 km/h (38 mph; 17 m/s).

As the oldest car, it wore the number "0" in the 1996 London to Brighton Veteran Car Run. The vehicle was sold at the 2007 Pebble Beach Concours d'Elegance for $3.52 million. It sold again in 2011 for $4.6 million, a record price for an early automobile.

== See als0 ==
- History of the automobile
- De Dion-Bouton
- American De Dion (automobile)
- Delamare-Deboutteville
- List of automobile sales by model
- Most expensive cars sold in auction
