= Higgs "Champion" Car Syndicate =

- Industry: Automotive
- Founded: 1899; 127 years ago
- Defunct: 1899; 127 years ago
- Headquarters: London, United Kingdom
- Products: Cars

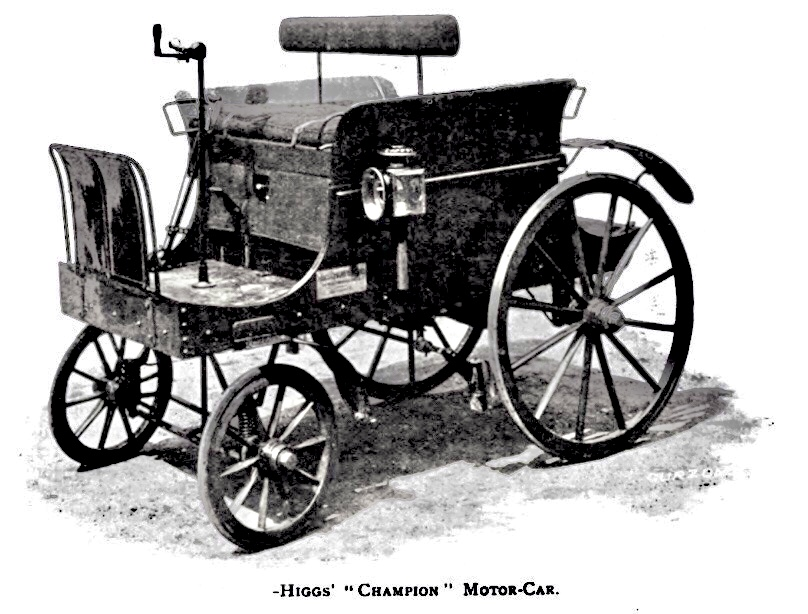
Higgs Champion Motor Car (1899)

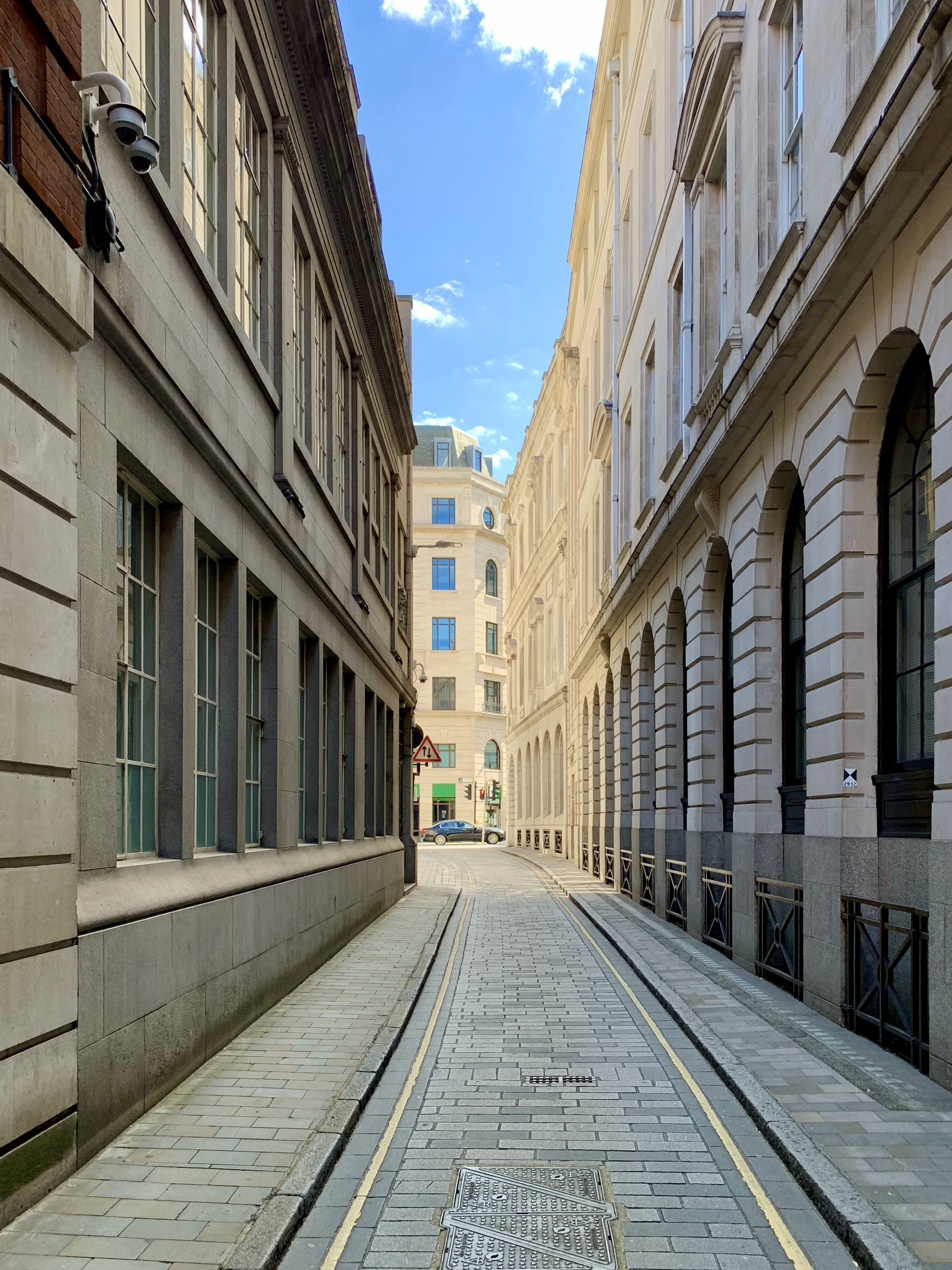
Ironmonger Lane, City of London

Motor De Dion-Bouton 1,75 hp

The Higgs "Champion" Car Syndicate was an English car manufacturer at London.

== History ==
The company began producing automobiles in 1899. The brand name was Champion. The workshop was located at 17 Ironmonger Lane in London. The four-seater dog-cart had an engine by De Dion-Bouton with 1.75 hp. The displacement of the single-cylinder engine is 239 cc with a bore of 66 mm and a stroke of 70 mm. The engine and the transmission are arranged under the "bodywork" so that none of the working components are visible. The engine drives a shaft via a pinion, which in turn acts on the rear axle through a belt. The exhibited car has only a single-gear transmission, but it was planned to install a two-speed gearbox in the future. The engine is started from the front seat using a foot pedal that engages with a gear. A hand lever is provided, which performs three functions: operating the band brake, turning off the electrical ignition, and moving the belt onto the loose pulley. Both the front and rear axles are equipped with coil springs. The car weighs complete about 4 cwt = 182 kg. The road wheels have wooden spokes, with solid rubber tires. Production ended in the same year 1899.

== See also ==
- List of car manufacturers of the United Kingdom
