= Owner–driver =

An owner–driver is a racecar driver who fully or partially owns the team they are driving for. The practice has been established since the beginning of automotive racing. However, owner–drivers are not as prominent today, especially as seen in the NASCAR Cup Series, primarily due to the expense and responsibilities involved, essentially having two jobs in one. However, there are many owner–driver teams in the lower tier Xfinity Series and Craftsman Truck Series.

The term is not to be confused with a driver who owns a separate team, such as Dale Earnhardt, who fielded his own team but still drove for Richard Childress Racing.

== History ==
In the early days of NASCAR, most drivers owned and drove their own car. While sponsorship was useful, it was not essential to win at this time, leaving less burden for the driver.

Lee Petty and Richard Petty won 10 championships (3 and 7, respectively) for their family team, Petty Enterprises. After Richard Petty's final championship in 1979, only two drivers have won for their own team: Alan Kulwicki in 1992 for AK Racing, and Tony Stewart in 2011 for Stewart-Haas Racing. As of 2026, only one driver competes full-time for their own team, Brad Keselowski for RFK Racing; two drivers compete part-time for their own teams, B. J. McLeod for Live Fast Motorsports and Jimmie Johnson for Legacy Motor Club.

== Notable owner–drivers in NASCAR's national series ==
The following list is a list of owner–drivers:

- Lee Petty 1949–1961 (Petty Enterprises)
- Herb Thomas 1949–1956
- Buck Baker 1949–1957
- Neil Castles 1957–1976
- Richard Petty 1958–1983; 1986–1992 (Petty Enterprises)
- Wendell Scott 1961–1973
- J.D. McDuffie 1963–1991
- John Sears 1964–1973
- Junior Johnson 1965 (Junior Johnson & Associates)
- James Hylton 1968–1993 (Hylton Motorsports)
- Cecil Gordon 1970–1983
- Richard Childress 1969; 1972; 1976–1981 (Richard Childress Racing)
- Dave Marcis 1969–1974; 1977; 1979–1983; 1985–2002 (Marcis Auto Racing)
- Darrell Waltrip 1972; 1991–1997 (Darrell Waltrip Motorsports)
- Jimmy Means 1978–1993 (Means Racing)
- Bobby Gerhart 1984–2018 (Gerhart Racing)
- Alan Kulwicki 1986–1993 (AK Racing)
- Cale Yarborough 1986–1987 (Cale Yarborough Motorsports)
- Morgan Shepherd 1986–present (Shepherd Racing Ventures)
- Geoff Bodine 1993–1997 (Geoff Bodine Racing)
- Joe Nemechek 1993; 1995; 2009–present (NEMCO Motorsports)
- Kevin Lepage 1994–1996
- Ricky Rudd 1994–1999 (Rudd Performance Motorsports)
- Bill Elliott 1995–2000 (Bill Elliott Racing)
- Brett Bodine 1996–2003 (Brett Bodine Racing)
- Kyle Petty 1997–1998 (PE2/Petty Enterprises)
- Derrike Cope 2001–2003, 2008–2010, 2012–2017 (Derrike Cope Racing) (StarCom Racing)
- Kevin Harvick 2001–2011 (Kevin Harvick Incorporated)
- Michael Waltrip 2001–2015 (Michael Waltrip Racing)
- Dale Earnhardt Jr. 2003–present (JR Motorsports)
- Robby Gordon 2004–2012 (Robby Gordon Motorsports)
- Mike Harmon 2007–present (Mike Harmon Racing)
- Norm Benning 2008–present (Norm Benning Racing)
- Brad Keselowski 2008–2015, 2022–present (Brad Keselowski Racing) (Roush Fenway Keselowski)
- Jeremy Clements 2008–2009, 2011–present (Jeremy Clements Racing)
- Jeremy Mayfield 2009 (Mayfield Motorsports)
- Chris Fontaine 2009–present (Glenden Enterprises)
- Tony Stewart 2009–2016 (Stewart–Haas Racing)
- Kyle Busch 2010–2023 (Kyle Busch Motorsports)
- Jennifer Jo Cobb 2010–present (Jennifer Jo Cobb Racing)
- Clay Greenfield 2013–present (Clay Greenfield Motorsports)
- Carl Long 2014–present (MBM Motorsports)
- B. J. McLeod 2015–present (B. J. McLeod Motorsports) (Live Fast Motorsports)
- Chad Finley 2016–present (Chad Finley Racing)
- Stewart Friesen 2016–present (Halmar Friesen Racing)
- Jordan Anderson 2018–present (Jordan Anderson Racing)
- Korbin Forrister 2018–2020 (All Out Motorsports)
- David Gilliland 2018–present (DGR-Crosley)
- Bo LeMastus 2018 (DGR-Crosley)
- Josh Reaume 2018–present (Reaume Brothers Racing)
- Jimmie Johnson 2025-present (Legacy Motor Club)
