= Pierre Giffard =

French journalist (1853-1922)

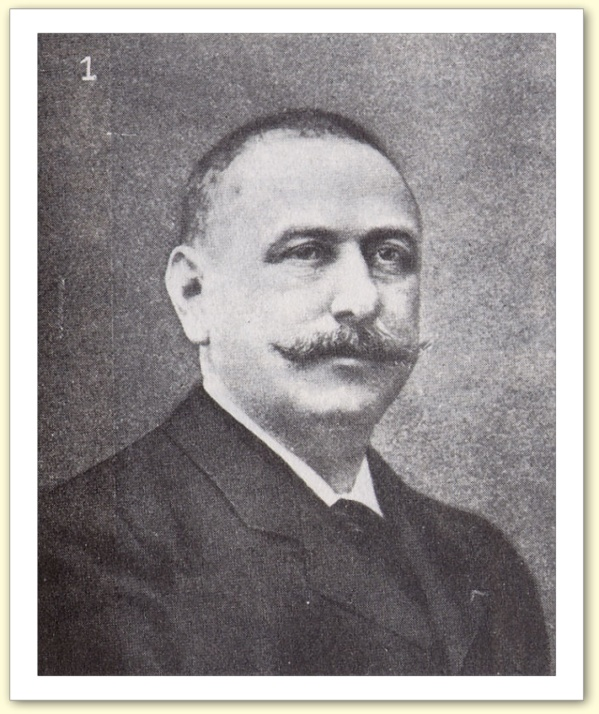
- Pierre Giffard
- Born: 1 May 1853; Fontaine-le-Dun, Seine-Maritime, France
- Died: 21 January 1922 (aged 68); Maisons-Laffitte, France
- Other names: Arator at Le Vélo; Jean-sans-Terre at Le Petit Journal
- Occupations: Journalist, editor, historian, author, politician

Pierre Giffard (French: [pjɛʁ ʒifaʁ]; 1 May 1853 – 21 January 1922) was a French journalist, a pioneer of modern political reporting, a newspaper publisher and a prolific sports organiser. In 1892, he was appointed Chevalier (Knight) of the Légion d'Honneur and in 1900 he was appointed an Officier (Officer) of the Légion d'Honneur.

Parisian newspapers used sporting events as circulation aids, and Giffard created the Paris–Brest–Paris cycle race in 1891, the 380 kilometre Paris–Belfort running race in 1892, the world's first car race from Paris to Rouen in 1894, the Paris Marathon in 1896, and a foot-race from Bordeaux to Paris in 1903.

Giffard served as the editor of Le Petit Journal and then the sports daily Le Vélo, where his passionate support for Alfred Dreyfus and thus his opposition to the car-maker Comte Jules-Albert de Dion over the whole Dreyfus affair led de Dion to create a rival daily, L'Auto, which in turn created the Tour de France cycle race.

== Early life ==
Pierre Giffard's father was a lawyer and mayor in Fontaine-le-Dun. Pierre was taught from the age of six by Father Biville at Saint-Laurent-en-Caux and from eight at the Lycée Pierre Corneille in Rouen. He completed his schooling in Paris, at the Lycée Charlemagne in the Marais district. It was there that he developed his republican ideas.

The Franco-Prussian War started in 1870 and Giffard enrolled in the army, with his parents' reluctant permission, at Fontaine-le-Dun in Normandy. He joined the reserve army in November at Le Havre. There, following the custom of the time, he was made an officer. He became a lieutenant on 10 December 1870. At the end of the war he resumed his studies at Douai, where he gained a university degree in August 1871.

Giffard's father died on 1 August 1872, and Giffard moved to Paris to work as a journalist.

== Journalism ==
Giffard had a long and successful career in journalism. Between 1873 and 1878 he worked for Le Corsaire, L'Evénement, La France, Le Gaulois, Le Petit Parisien, La Lanterne and finally Le Figaro. He then assumed editorship of Le Petit Journal in 1887 and of the sports daily Le Vélo in 1896.

After an abortive election attempt in 1900 Giffard returned to full-time journalism at Le Vélo until its demise in 1904. He then joined Matin, which sent him to the Far East to cover the Russia-Japan war. He returned to Paris in July 1904, weakened by illness, and proceeded to work for several papers, including Dépêche Coloniale and Petit Marseillais. In June 1906, now one of the senior journalists of France, he went back to Le Figaro and reported the first meeting of the Russian parliament. In 1910 Giffard was employed by his arch-rival Henri Desgrange writing for L'Auto until retirement.

=== Le Figaro ===
Giffard joined Le Figaro on the strength of his reports of the World Exhibition in Paris and of conferences he organised there concerning the invention of the telephone and telegraph. He reported from Switzerland, Belgium, Germany, Italy, Greece, Austria, Scotland, Algeria, Tunisia, Malta, Cyprus, Spain, the Netherlands and Denmark. He reported on the attack by French troops on Cheikh Bouamama fr:Cheikh Bouamama in Algeria and the taking of Sfax in Tunisia, and the arrival of the British fleet at Alexandria and the departure of the French navy.

In June 1906, he went back to Le Figaro and reported the first meeting of the Russian parliament, the Douma.

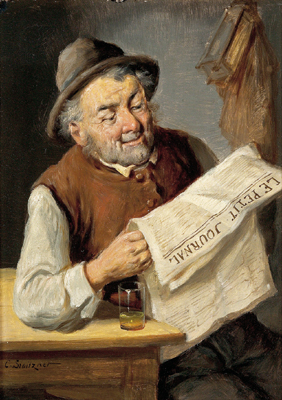
Le Petit Journal by Konstantin Stoitzner.

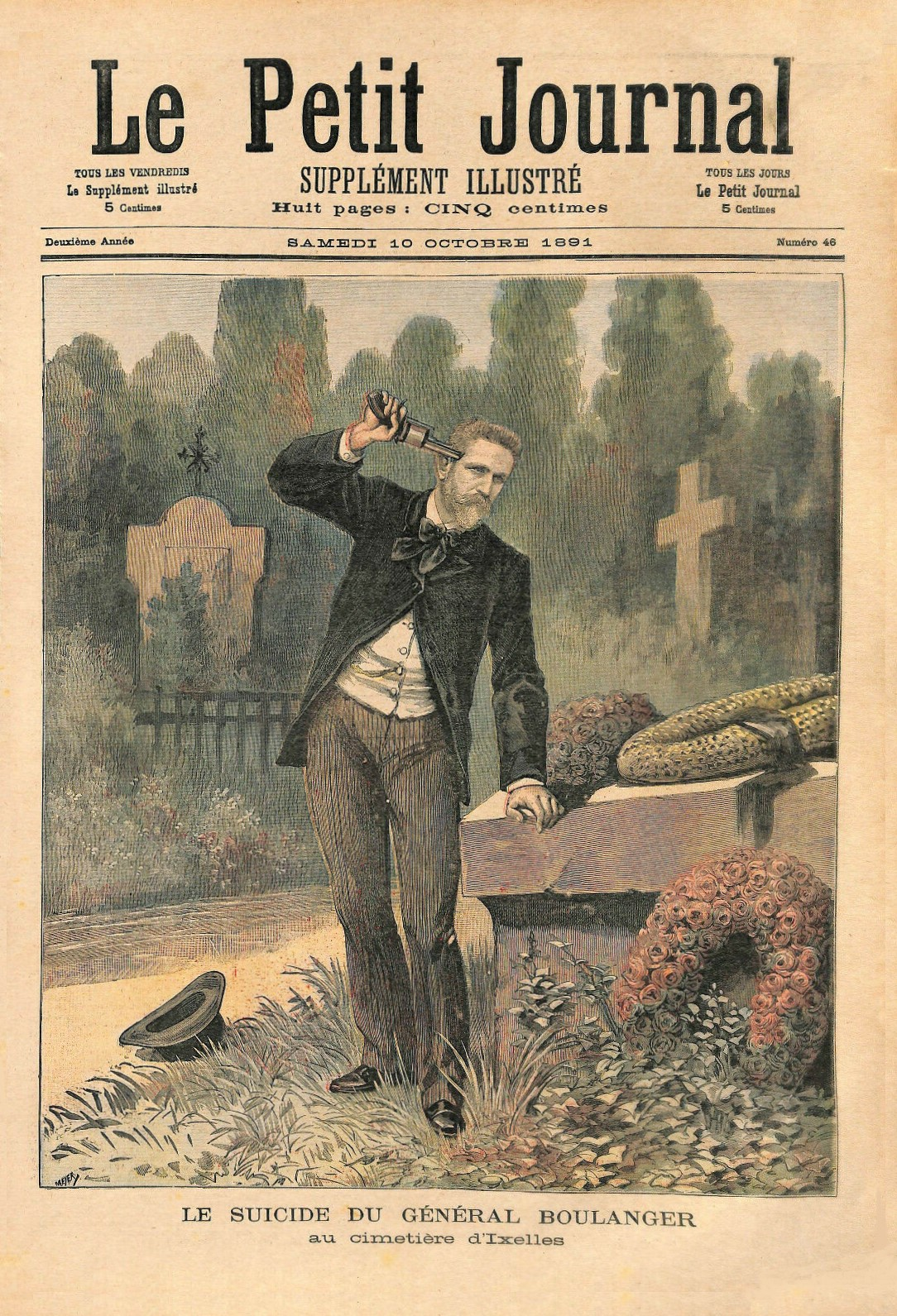
10 October 1891. The suicide of Georges Boulanger in Ixelles Cemetery.

=== Le Petit Journal ===
Hippolyte Auguste Marinoni (Note: Hippolyte Auguste Marinoni was known for his invention of the rotary press, although Richard March Hoe patented such a device in 1847.) asked Giffard to reorganise the newsroom of the daily paper, Le Petit Journal. He began work on 1 October 1887. There he started a diary which, in the tradition of the paper, he signed with a pseudonym: Jean-sans-Terre. He stayed at the paper for 10 years. In 1891 he organised the Paris–Brest–Paris bicycle race for the newspaper, followed by the Paris–Belfort running race. In 1892, he was appointed a member of the Légion d'Honneur, and in 1900 he was appointed as an officer.

=== Le Vélo ===
In 1896, he joined his colleague Paul Rousseau at the head of the newspaper, Le Vélo, where he wrote under the name Arator. There on 19 July 1896 he organised the first Paris marathon and helped found the Automobile Club de France.

In 1900 he threw the paper in support of Alfred Dreyfus in the Dreyfus affair. France was divided over the justice of his trial for selling military secrets to the Germans. The paper's largest advertisers, anti-Dreyfusards such as Count Jules-Albert de Dion, Adolphe Clément and Édouard Michelin believed Dreyfus guilty and removed their advertising from the paper. They then launched a rival paper, at first called L'Auto-Vélo and then simply L'Auto.

A circulation war broke out between the two papers. Le Vélo's biggest publicity stunts included staging a second edition of the Paris–Brest–Paris cycle-race in 1901, that he had created in 1891. L'Auto's response came on 19 December 1902, when Géo Lefèvre suggested a Tour de France which was an overwhelming circulation success in 1903. Le Vélo's response in 1903 was a running-race from Bordeaux to Paris, but it was too late. Le Vélo disappeared in 1904 and Giffard eventually joined Desgrange's staff at L'Auto.

== Events organiser ==
Special 'Paris–Belfort' edition of Le Petit Journal from 18 June 1892

=== Paris–Brest–Paris cycle race ===
Giffard created the Paris–Brest–Paris cycle race in 1891, although it was promoted as Paris–Brest et retour in his editorials which he signed "Jean-sans-Terre". It is now established as the oldest long-distance cycling road event. Le Petit Journal described it as an "épreuve," a test of the bicycle's reliability and the rider's endurance. Riders were fully self-sufficient, carrying their own food and clothing and riding the same bicycle for the duration. The public response to his articles was so phenomenal that he had to change the rules and start charging 5 francs entrance, as 300 riders including 7 women signed up, although the women were later refused entrance. Each bicycle was given an 'official seal' at a two-day ceremony in front of the offices of Le Petit Journal. The 280 sealed machines included 10 tricycles, 2 Tandem bicycles, and 1 Penny-farthing.

Participation was restricted to Frenchmen and 99 of the 207 (or 280) participants finished. Michelin's Charles Terront won in 71 hours 22 minutes after passing Dunlop's Jiel-Laval as he slept during the third night. Both had suffered punctures in their pneumatic tyres, but still enjoyed an advantage over riders on solid tires.

The first race was a coup for Le Petit Journal and the organisers decided to run it every ten years. The second race in 1901 was again organised by Giffard but on behalf of Le Vélo.

=== Paris–Belfort running race ===
On 5 June 1892, Giffard organised a foot-race from Paris to Belfort, a course of over 380 kilometers, the first large scale long-distance running race on record. Over 1,100 competitors registered for the event and over 800 started from the offices of Le Petit Journal, at Paris Opera. This had also been the start point for the inaugural Paris–Brest–Paris cycle-race the previous year. Newspaper circulation dramatically increased as the French public followed the progress of race participants, 380 of whom completed the course in under 10 days. In Le Petit Journal on 18 June 1892, Giffard praised the event as a model for the physical training of a nation faced by hostile neighbours. The event was won by Constant Ramoge in 100 hours 5 minutes.

=== Paris–Rouen, world's first motorcar race ===
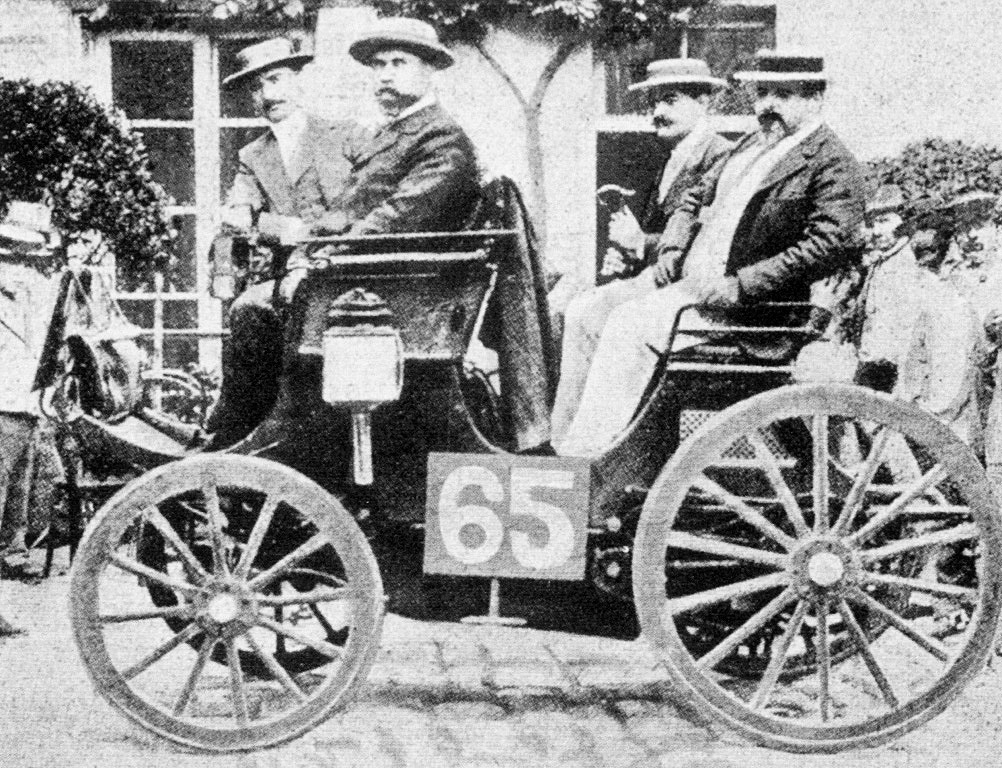
Georges Lemaître classified 1st in his Peugeot 3hp

In 1894, when Giffard was editor in chief of newspaper Le Petit Journal, he organised what is considered to be the world's first car race from Paris to Rouen, (Note: A previous motoring event had been held in 1887 but received only a single entrant. Georges Bouton and his passenger the Comte Jules-Albert de Dion had completed the 2 mile drive from the Bois de Boulogne to Porte Maillot in a steam powered vehicle of their own manufacture, the genesis of the De Dion-Bouton.) sporting events were a tried and tested form of publicity stunt and circulation booster. The paper promoted it as a Competition for Horeseless Carriages (Concours des Voitures sans Chevaux) that were not dangerous, easy to drive, and cheap during the journey. Thus it blurred the distinctions between a reliability trial, a general event and a race, but the main prize was for the first across the finish line in Rouen. 102 people paid the 10 franc entrance fee.

On 22 July 1894, 69 cars started the 50 km selection event that would show which entrants would be allowed to start the main event, the 127 km race from Paris to Rouen. The entrants ranged from serious manufacturers like Peugeot, Panhard or De Dion to amateur owners, and only 25 were selected for the main race.

The race started from Porte Maillot and went through the Bois de Boulogne. Count Jules-Albert de Dion was first into Rouen after 6 hours and 48 minutes at an average speed of 19 km/h. He finished 3’30" ahead of Albert Lemaître (Peugeot), followed by Doriot (Peugeot) at 16’30", René Panhard (Panhard) at 33’30’’ and Émile Levassor (Panhard) at 55’30”. The official winners were Peugeot and Panhard as cars were judged on their speed, handling and safety characteristics, and De Dion's steam car needed a stoker which was forbidden.

=== Paris Marathon ===
On 18 July 1896 Giffard organised the inaugural Paris Marathon on behalf of Le Petit Journal, although he was editor of Le Vélo, suggesting a cooperative commercial relationship. The event followed on from the success of the marathon in the 1896 inaugural Olympics. Gifford started the race before a large crowd at the Porte Maillot, and it followed a course to Versailles and finished in Conflans-Sainte-Honorine. The race and the 200-franc prize were won by Len Hurst, a 24-year-old brick maker from England.

=== Bordeaux–Paris foot race ===
Giffard organised the first foot-race from Bordeaux to Paris in 1903, which was won by Francois Peguet in 114 hours 22 minutes 20 seconds with Emil Anthoine in second place.

== Books ==
Title illustration for La Reine Bicyclette published in 1891

=== La Reine Bicyclette ===
The phrase "la petite reine" has passed into the French language as a term for a bicycle. The origins are in 1891, when Giffard wrote a history of bicycle development, La Reine Bicyclette. The expression was made more emblematic by the picture on the cover, of a young woman wearing a modern bicycle as a crown. The title was intended to describe the spirit that the bicycle had brought to her life. Cycling enthusiasts adopted the name, calling their machine "la petite reine".

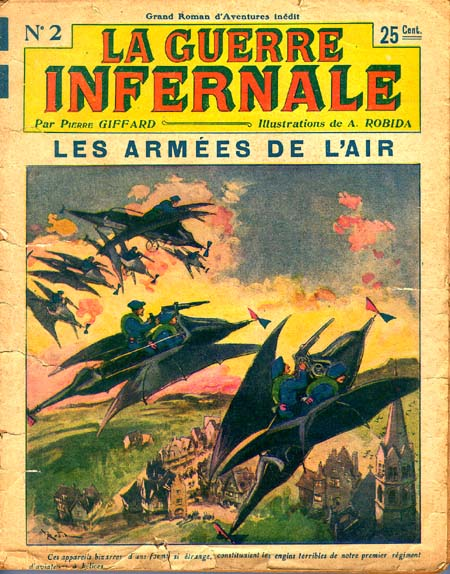
La Guerre Infernale, Episode 2, January 1908

=== Le Sieur de Va-Partout ===
Le Sieur de Va-Partout was the first French book in a new style, the literature of reporting, and therefore of a new type of author: the writer-reporter.

=== La Fin du Cheval ===
La Fin du Cheval was Giffard's 1899 humorous thesis on the inevitable replacement of the horse by the bicycle, then by the car. It was illustrated by Albert Robida.

=== La Guerre Infernale ===
La Guerre Infernale was an adventure novel for children, published as a serial, an edition appearing every Saturday. The 520 illustrations were created by Albert Robida. It described a world war, years before it happened, describing an attack on London by the Germans and war between Japan and the United States. It was subsequently republished as a book.

== Politics ==
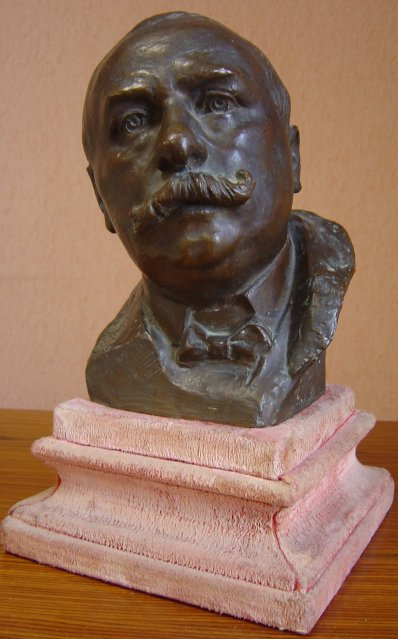
Bust of Pierre Giffard

Giffard stood in the national election of March 1900, a candidate in the 2nd constituency of Seine-Inférieure (Yvetot). A passionate left wing Dreyfussard, he failed due to the general Dreyfusine rift in French politics, and he was a victim of de Dion's sometimes violent anti-Dreyfussard stance. (Note: In 1899 at the Auteuil horse-race course in Paris, the President of France (Émile Loubet) was struck on the head by a 'walking stick' wielded by the Comte Albert de Dion, who subsequently served 15 days in gaol.) De Dion had distributed free copies of Giffard's humorous book La Fin du Cheval, claiming it to be Giffard's political program.

== Death, honours and commemoration ==
In 1892, Giffard was appointed 'Chevalier' (Knight) of the Légion d'Honneur and in September 1900, at the Paris Exposition, he was appointed an 'Officier' (Officer) of the Légion d'Honneur.

He died on 21 January 1922 at his home in Maisons-Laffitte where he had lived since 1883.

The rue de Pierre Giffard in the Paris suburb of Saint-Denis is named in his honour.
