= Le Vélo =

French sports newspaper

- Type: Daily newspaper
- Editor: Paul Rousseau (1892-?); Louis Minart (?-1896; Pierre Giffard (1896-1904)
- Founded: 1892
- Ceased publication: 1904
- Political alignment: Liberalism

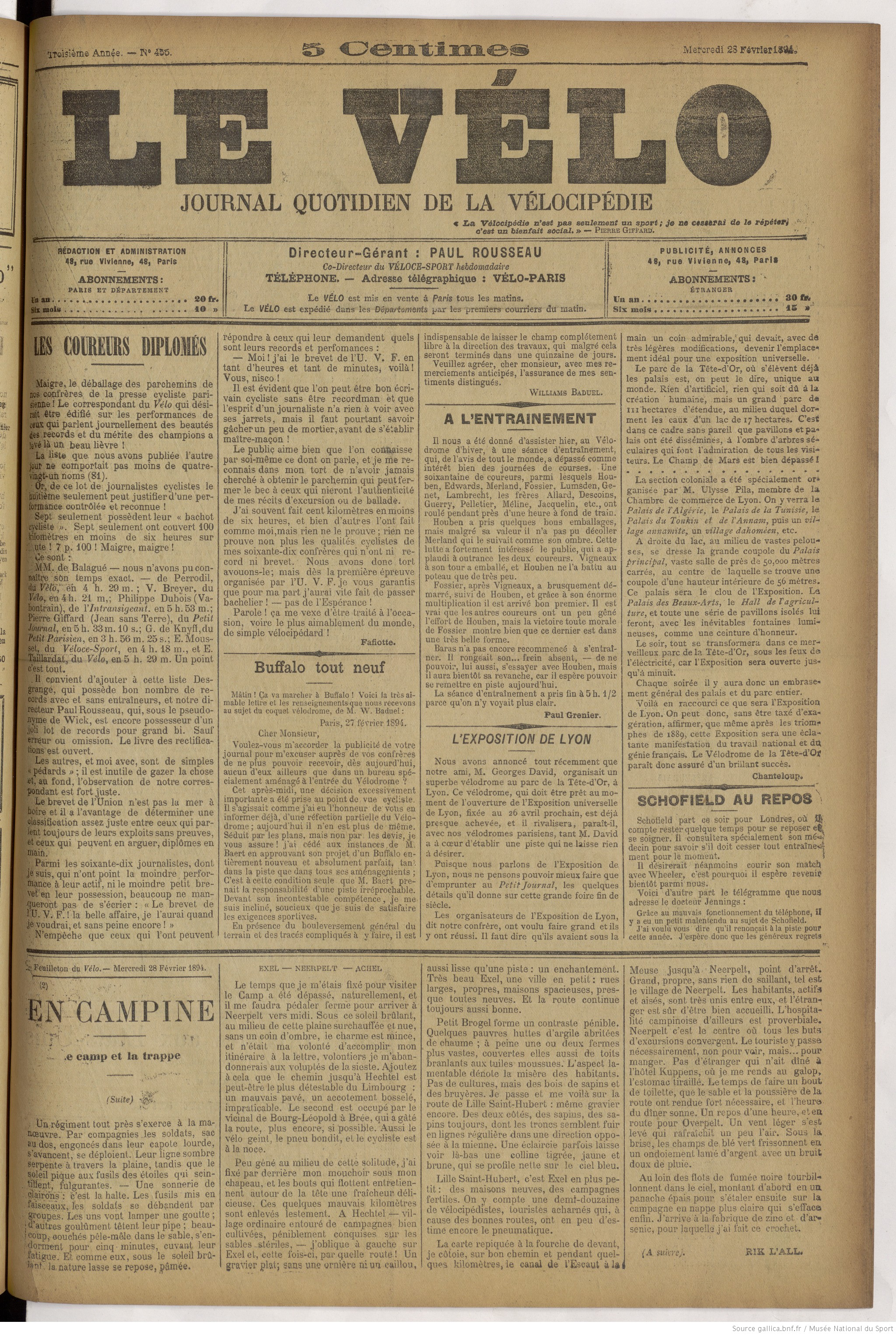
Front page of Le Vélo on February 28, 1894

Le Vélo was the leading French sports newspaper from its inception on 1 December 1892 until it ceased publication in 1904. Mixing sports reporting with news and political comment, it achieved a circulation of 80,000 copies a day. Its use of sporting events as promotional tools led to the creation of the Paris–Roubaix cycle race in 1896, and the popularisation of the Bordeaux–Paris cycle race during the 1890s.

Its demise was a consequence of the creation of the Tour de France by L'Auto, a rival newspaper that had been founded in 1900 from the intense animosity generated by the Dreyfus affair. Le Vélo was easily recognised by the green-tinted newsprint on which it was published, so L'Auto (née L'Auto-Vélo) was distinguished by a yellow tint, and thus the 'Yellow Jersey' worn by the leader of the 'Tour de France'.

== Personnel ==
Pierre Giffard was a French journalist, a pioneer of modern political reporting, a newspaper publisher and a prolific sports organizer. In 1896, he joined his colleague Paul Rousseau at the head of Le Vélo, where he wrote under the name Arator. Le Vélo was widely considered to be the premier sports newspaper produced in France. He had been a journalist with Le Figaro before becoming editor of Le Petit Journal, on whose behalf he had created Paris–Brest–Paris in 1891. On 19 July 1896 he organised the first Paris marathon and helped found the Automobile Club de France. As editor of Le Vélo, his opposition to the car-maker Albert de Dion over the Dreyfus affair led de Dion to create a rival daily, L'Auto.

Géo Lefèvre was a sports journalist who was recruited from Le Vélo, to work as a rugby and cycling correspondent for L'Auto. Lefèvre's idea for 'a six-day race round France' lead to the demise of his old paper. Victor Breyer was the cycling editor for Le Vélo, and he was the first to reconnoitre the route for the 1896 Paris–Roubaix cycle race, which was promoted by the director at the time, Paul Rousseau.

== Paris–Roubaix ==
In February 1896 two Roubaix businessmen, Theodore Vienne and Maurice Perez, contacted Louis Minart, the editor of Le Vélo, and suggested a race from Paris to Roubaix. Minart was enthusiastic but said the decision of whether the paper would run the start and provide publicity belonged to the director, Paul Rousseau. Minart may also have suggested an indirect approach because Vienne and Perez recommended their race not on its own merits but as preparation for another. Rousseau was immediately sold on the notion, and sent his cycling editor Victor Breyer to recce the route on a bicycle. Vienne and Perez wrote:

Dear M. Rousseau, Bordeaux–Paris is approaching and this great annual event which has done so much to promote cycling has given us an idea. What would you think of a training race which preceded Bordeaux–Paris by four weeks? The distance between Paris and Roubaix is roughly 280km, so it would be child's play for the future participants of Bordeaux–Paris. The finish would take place at the Roubaix vélodrome after several laps of the track. Everyone would be assured of an enthusiastic welcome as most of our citizens have never had the privilege of seeing the spectacle of a major road race and we count on enough friends to believe that Roubaix is truly a hospitable town. As prizes we already have subscribed to a first prize of 1,000 francs in the name of the Roubaix velodrome and we will be busy establishing a generous prize list which will be to the satisfaction of all. But for the moment, can we count on the patronage of Le Vélo and on your support for organising the start?

The first prize represented seven months' wages for a miner. Rousseau was enthusiastic and sent his cycling editor, Victor Breyer, to find a route. Breyer travelled to Amiens in a Panhard driven by his colleague, Paul Meyan. The following morning Breyer — later deputy organiser of the Tour de France and a leading official of the Union Cycliste Internationale — continued by bike. The wind blew, the rain fell and the temperature dropped. Breyer reached Roubaix filthy and exhausted after a day of riding on disjointed cobbles. He swore he would send a telegram to Minart urging him to drop the idea, saying it was dangerous to send a race the way he had just ridden. But that evening, following a meal and drinks with the team from Roubaix, he changed his mind.

== The Dreyfus affair ==
The Dreyfus affair split French opinion at the turn of the 20th century, causing passionate and physical arguments. Pierre Giffard, the Director of Le Velo, was a 'left-wing' 'Dreyfusard' while many of the manufacturers who funded the advertisements were anti-Dreyfusards, especially the Comte Jules-Albert de Dion, owner of the De Dion-Bouton car works. The comte was arrested and spent 15 days in jail after a melee at the Auteuil horse-race course in 1899, because he had struck the President of France, Émile Loubet, over the head with a walking stick. Giffard's tone of reporting this led to a group of 'anti-Dreyfusards' including de Dion, Adolphe Clément and Édouard Michelin to withdraw advertising. Subsequently, in 1900, they entrusted Henri Desgrange (editor of Paris-Velo or Le Petit Velo) to create the L'Auto-Velo in direct competition to Le Vélo. The deliberate similarity of the names triggered a court case by Le Vélo for infringement of title, which it duly won on January 16, 1903 and thus L'Auto was renamed.

There are slightly varying reports about the reason for the breakaway of L'Auto. Either the advertisers withdrew their custom whilst planning a paper of their own, or an alternative version has it that Giffard banished them. Either way, Le Vélo was directly involved in a 'circulation war' that only one side could win.

== Advent of the Tour de France and the demise of Le Vélo ==
Le Vélo had always achieved good circulation boosts from the cycle races it sponsored, including the second edition of the 1200 km Paris–Brest–Paris in 1901, as well as the yearly Bordeaux–Paris and Paris–Roubaix one-day classics.

By 1903, in a bid to stem falling circulation, L'Auto launched the initial Tour de France, and the success of the race boosted its circulation, to the detriment of Le Velo.

In 1904 Le Vélo ceased its activities and collaborationist L'Auto eventually transmogrified into L'Équipe in 1944.

== See also ==
- Le Vélocipède Illustré
