= Motion lines =

Abstract line added to convey movement

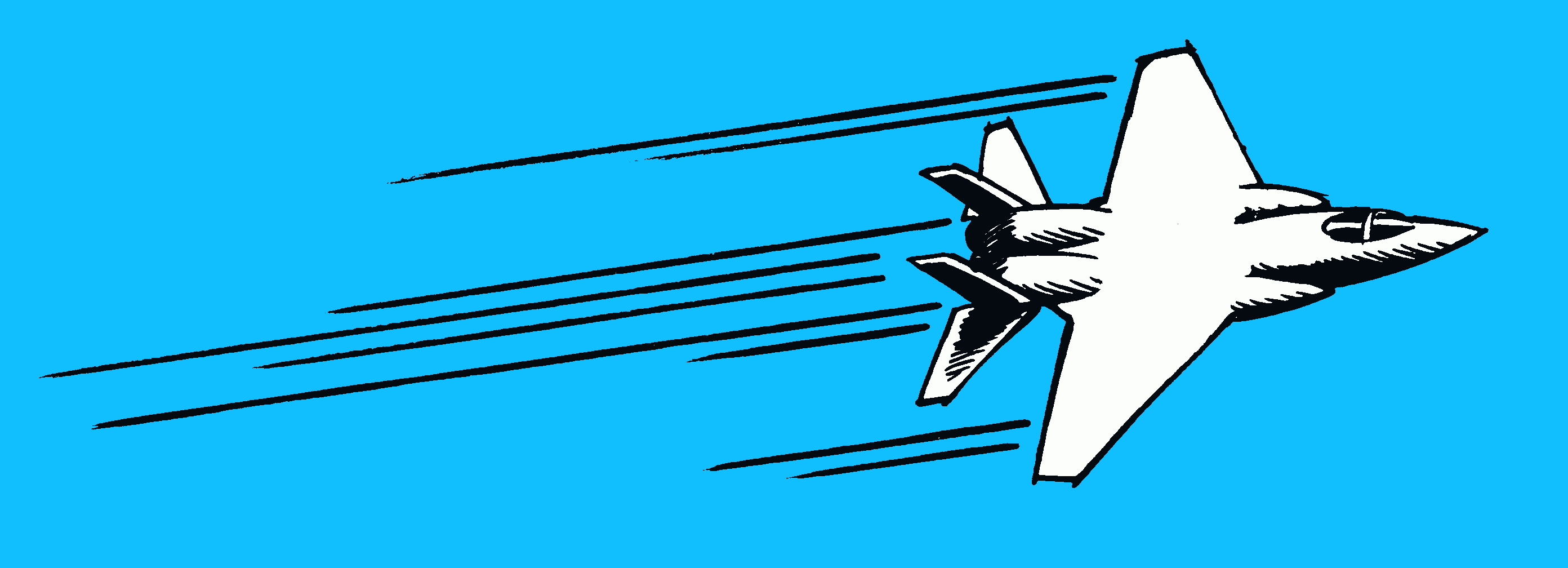
A drawing of an airplane with motion lines to indicate that it is moving fast

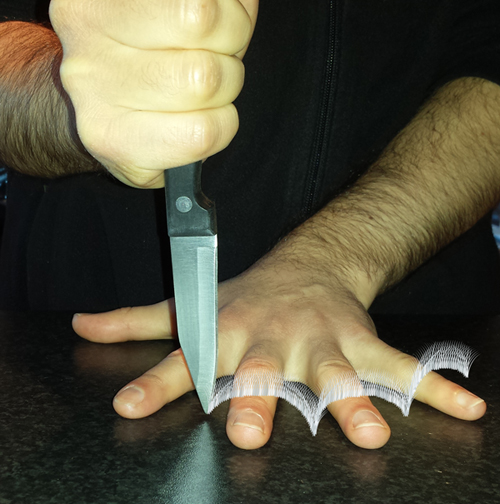
Motion lines added with photo-editing software, to imply motion

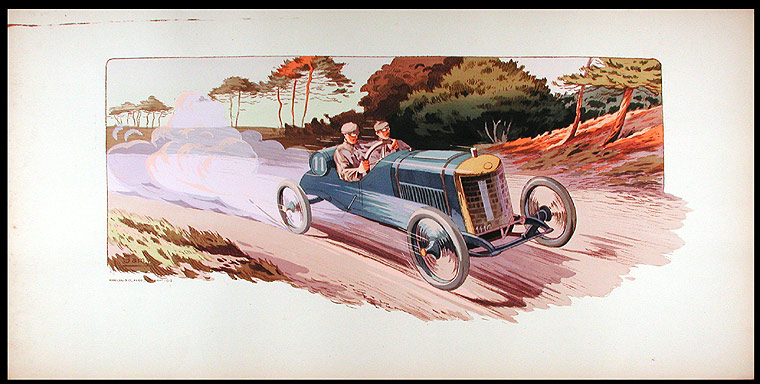
Grand Prix de France 1913 Ernest Montaut

In comics and art more broadly, motion lines (also known as movement lines, action lines, speed lines, or zip ribbons) are the abstract lines that appear behind a moving object or person, parallel to its direction of movement, to make it appear as if it is moving quickly. They are common in Japanese manga and anime, of which Speed Racer is a classic example.

Lines depicting wind and the trajectory of missiles appear in art as early as the 16th century. By the 19th century artists were drawing naturally occurring speed lines when showing the passage of an object through water or snow, but it was not until the 1870s that artists like Wilhelm Busch and Adolphe Willette began drawing motion lines to depict the movement of objects through air.

The French artist Ernest Montaut is usually credited with the invention of speed lines. He used the technique freely in his posters which were produced at a time when auto racing, speedboat racing and aircraft races were in their infancy. The effect is similar to the blur caused by panning in still photography.

Carmine Infantino was one of the best known practitioners of motion lines, particularly in his illustration of Silver Age Flash comics.

The use of motion lines in art is similar to the lines showing mathematical vectors, which are used to indicate direction and force. A similar effect is found in long-exposure photography, where a camera can capture lights as they move through time and space, blurred along the direction of motion.

== See also ==
- Nude Descending a Staircase, No. 2, for Marcel Duchamp's use of a painterly technique to the same effect
- Grawlixes
