= Jules-Albert de Dion =

French automotive pioneer (1856–1946)

Marquis Jules-Albert de Dion
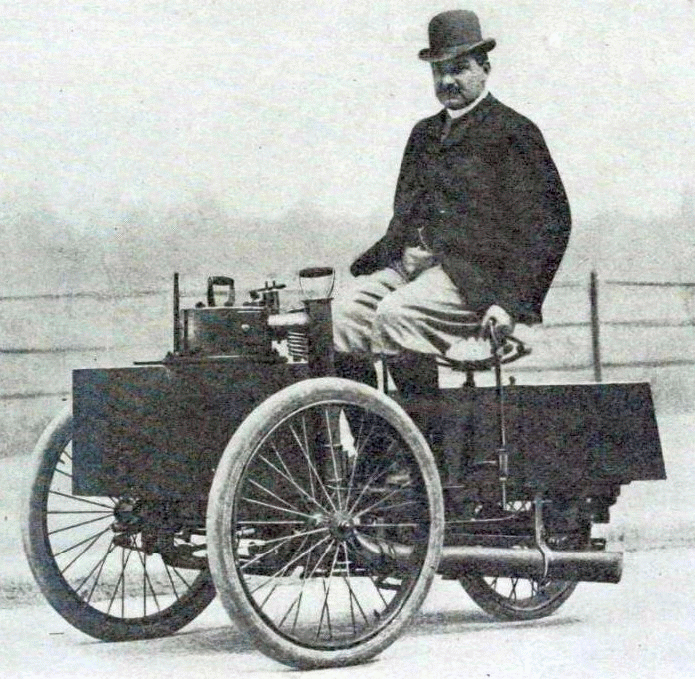
- de Dion on a steam car
- Born: Jules Félix Philippe Albert de Dion de Wandonne; 9 March 1856; Carquefou, Loire-Atlantique, French Second Empire
- Died: 19 August 1946 (aged 90); Paris, French Fourth Republic
- Known for: Automobile, motorcycle pioneer; Dreyfus affair

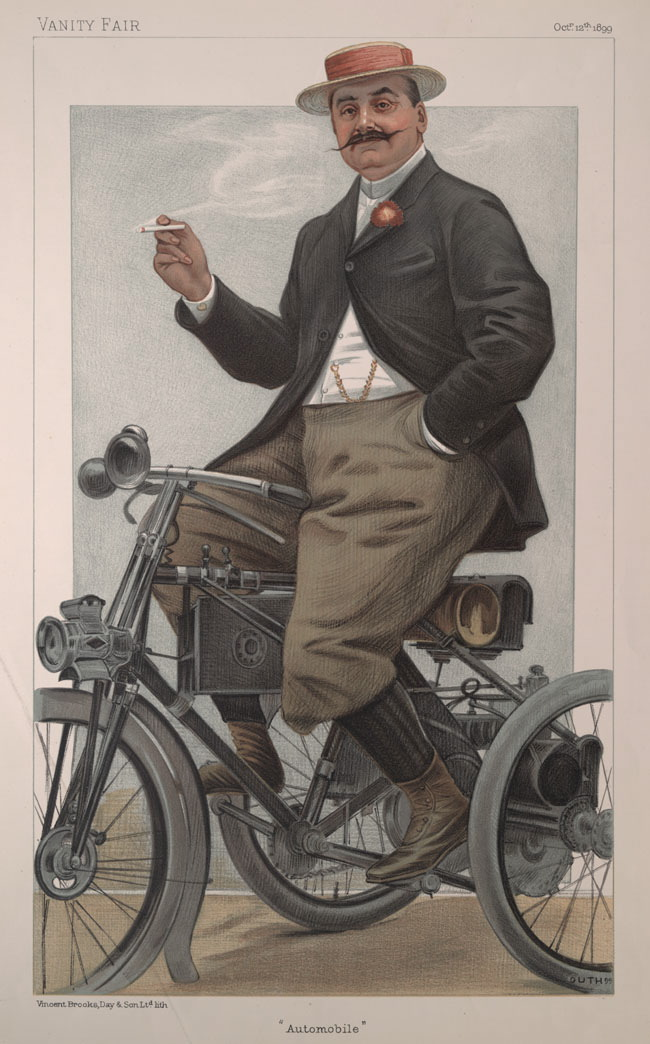
"Automobile". Caricature by Guth published in Vanity Fair in 1899.

Blazon de Dion

Marquis Jules Félix Philippe Albert de Dion de Wandonne (French pronunciation: [ʒyl feliks filip albɛʁ də djɔ̃ də wɑ̃dɔn]; 9 March 1856 – 19 August 1946) was a French pioneer of the automobile industry. He invented a steam-powered car and used it to win the world's first auto race, but his vehicle was adjudged to be against the rules. He was a co-founder of De Dion-Bouton, the world's largest automobile manufacturer for a time, as well as the French sports newspaper L'Équipe.

== Life ==
Dion was the heir of a leading French noble family, in 1901 succeeding his father Louis Albert William Joseph de Dion de Wandonne as count and later marquis. A "notorious duellist", he also had a passion for mechanics. He had already built a model steam engine when, in 1881, he saw one in a store window and asked about building another. The engineers, Georges Bouton and his brother-in-law, Charles Trépardoux, had a shop in Léon where they made scientific toys. Needing money for Trépardoux's long-time dream of a steam car, they acceded to De Dion's request.

During 1883, they formed a partnership which became the De Dion-Bouton automobile company, the world's largest automobile manufacturer for a time. They tried marine steam engines, but progressed to a steam car which used belts to drive the front wheels whilst steering with the rear. This was destroyed by fire during trials. In 1884, they built another, "La Marquise", with steerable front wheels and drive to the rear wheels. As of 2011, it is the world's oldest running car, and is capable of carrying four people at up to 38 miles per hour (61 km/h).

Count de Dion entered one in an 1887 trial, "Europe's first motoring competition", the brainchild of Paul Faussier of cycling magazine Le Vélocipède Illustré. Evidently, the promotion was insufficient, as the de Dion was the sole entrant, but it completed the course.

The de Dion tube (or 'dead axle') was actually invented by steam advocate Trépardoux, just before he resigned because the company was turning to internal combustion.

In 1898, he co-founded the Salon de l'Automobile (Paris Motor Show).

He died in 1946, age 90, and is buried in Montparnasse Cemetery in Paris. There is a memorial plaque in the family chapel in Wandonne, 3 kilometres (1.9 mi) south of Audincthun in the Pas-de-Calais.

== Racing career ==
Motor racing was started in France as a direct result of the enthusiasm with which the French public embraced the motor car. Manufacturers were enthusiastic due to the possibility of using motor racing as a shop window for their cars. The first motor race took place on 22 July 1894 and was organised by Le Petit Journal, a Parisian newspaper. It was run over the 122 kilometres (76 mi) distance between Paris and Rouen. The race was won by de Dion, although he was not awarded the prize for first place as his steam-powered car required a stoker and the judges deemed this outside of their requirements.

== Dreyfus affair and L'Auto ==
The roots of both the Tour de France cycle race and L'Auto (L'Équipe), a daily sporting newspaper, can be traced to the Dreyfus affair and de Dion's passionate anti-Dreyfusard opinion and actions.

Opinions were heated and there were demonstrations by both sides in the Dreyfus affair. Historian Eugen Weber described an 1899 conflagration at the Auteuil horse-race course in Paris as "an absurd political shindig" when, among other events, de Dion struck the President of France, Émile Loubet, on the head with a walking stick. De Dion served 15 days in jail and was fined 100 francs, and his behaviour was heavily criticised by Le Vélo, the largest daily sports newspaper in France, and its Dreyfusard editor, Pierre Giffard.

As a result, de Dion withdrew all his advertising from the paper, and in 1900, he led a group of wealthy "anti-Dreyfusard" manufacturers, including Édouard Michelin and Adolphe Clément, to start a rival daily sports paper, L'Auto-Vélo, and compete directly with Le Vélo. De Dion and Michelin were also concerned with Le Vélo – which reported on more than cycling – because its financial backer was one of their commercial rivals, the Darracq company. De Dion believed that Le Vélo gave Darracq too much attention and him too little. After a legally enforced change of name to L'Auto, it in turn created the Tour de France race in 1903 to boost falling circulation.

De Dion was an outspoken man who already wrote columns for Le Figaro, Le Matin and others. His wealth allowed him to indulge his whims, which also included refounding Le Nain jaune ('The Yellow Gnome'), a fortnightly publication which "answers no particular need".
