= Ernest Montaut =

French painter

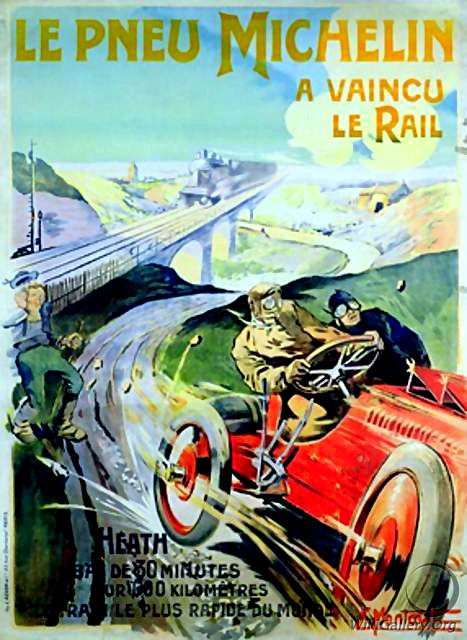

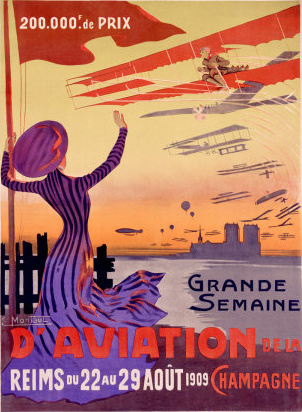

Ernest Montaut (1878–1909) was a French poster artist who died at an early age. He is credited with the invention of various artistic techniques, such as speed lines and distorting perspective by foreshortening to create the impression of speed. These techniques are still in use.

Montaut's printmaking career started in the late 19th century. He used a lithographic stone to produce an outline of the image, the Pochoir process, often including the year of publication, the artist's name and that of the printer Mabileau et Cie., Paris. Printed on the image was also a descriptive title advertising cars, tires, carburettors etc., and various sponsoring firms. The outlines were then painted by hand using watercolour paints. The process took a few days for each print and was quite labour-intensive. The different artists resulted in noticeable variations in colour.

Montaut's images display action, drama and derring-do – tortuous mountain passes covered at breakneck speed by the newly invented automobile. They document early developments in the history of motorised transport, such as motorboat racing, motorcycle and motor car racing, zeppelins and biplanes. His first motoring prints were created in the mid-1890s, and by 1897, the images had become pictorial records of the many racing events in France. Montaut's work was popular in Paris and was shown in the fashionable outlets on the Rue de l'Opera and Rue de la Paix.

Prints continued to be produced after Montaut's death in 1909 and it is thought that those signed 'Gamy' were created by Montaut's wife, Marguerite – 'Gamy' being an anagram of 'Magy', her nickname. Her works were occasionally signed 'M. Montaut'. Artists known to have collaborated with Montaut include Roowy, Nevil, Campion, Aldelmo, Brie, Dufourt and Jobbe du Val.
