= Georges Bouton =

French toymaker and engineer

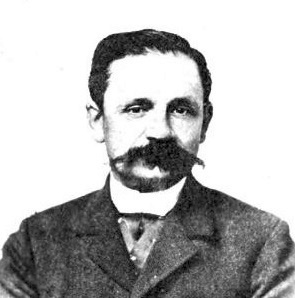

Georges Tradée Bouton (1847–1938) was a French toymaker and engineer who with fellow Frenchman Jules-Albert de Dion founded the De Dion-Bouton company in 1883. The pair first worked together in 1882 to produce a self-propelled steam vehicle. The result gave birth to the company which, at the time, went under the name Trépardoux et Cie.

Bouton was the nominal winner of the 'world's first motor race' on 28 April 1887, when he drove a de Dion-Bouton vehicle 2 kilometers from Neuilly Bridge to the Bois de Boulogne. He was also the only competitor.

== Personal life ==
Georges Bouton and his brother-in-law Charles Trépardoux ran a 'scientific toys' shop in Léon, Landes.

== De Dion-Bouton ==
The genesis of De Dion-Bouton was in 1881 when de Dion saw a toy locomotive in a store window at "passage Léon" (covered passage in Paris) and asked the toymakers to build another. The engineers Georges Bouton and Charles Trépardoux had been making a bare living selling scientific toys, and Trépardoux had long dreamed of building a steam car, but could not afford it. Dion, who was inspired by steam railway locomotives, could finance the work. Trépardoux et Cie was formed in Paris in 1883. This became the de Dion-Bouton automobile company, the world's largest automobile manufacturer for a time, becoming well known for their quality, reliability, and durability. However, both Bouton and Dion survived the company they had founded, as De Dion-Bouton went out of business in 1932.

== See also ==
- American De Dion (automobile)
