= De Dion-Bouton =

French automobile company

De Dion–Bouton
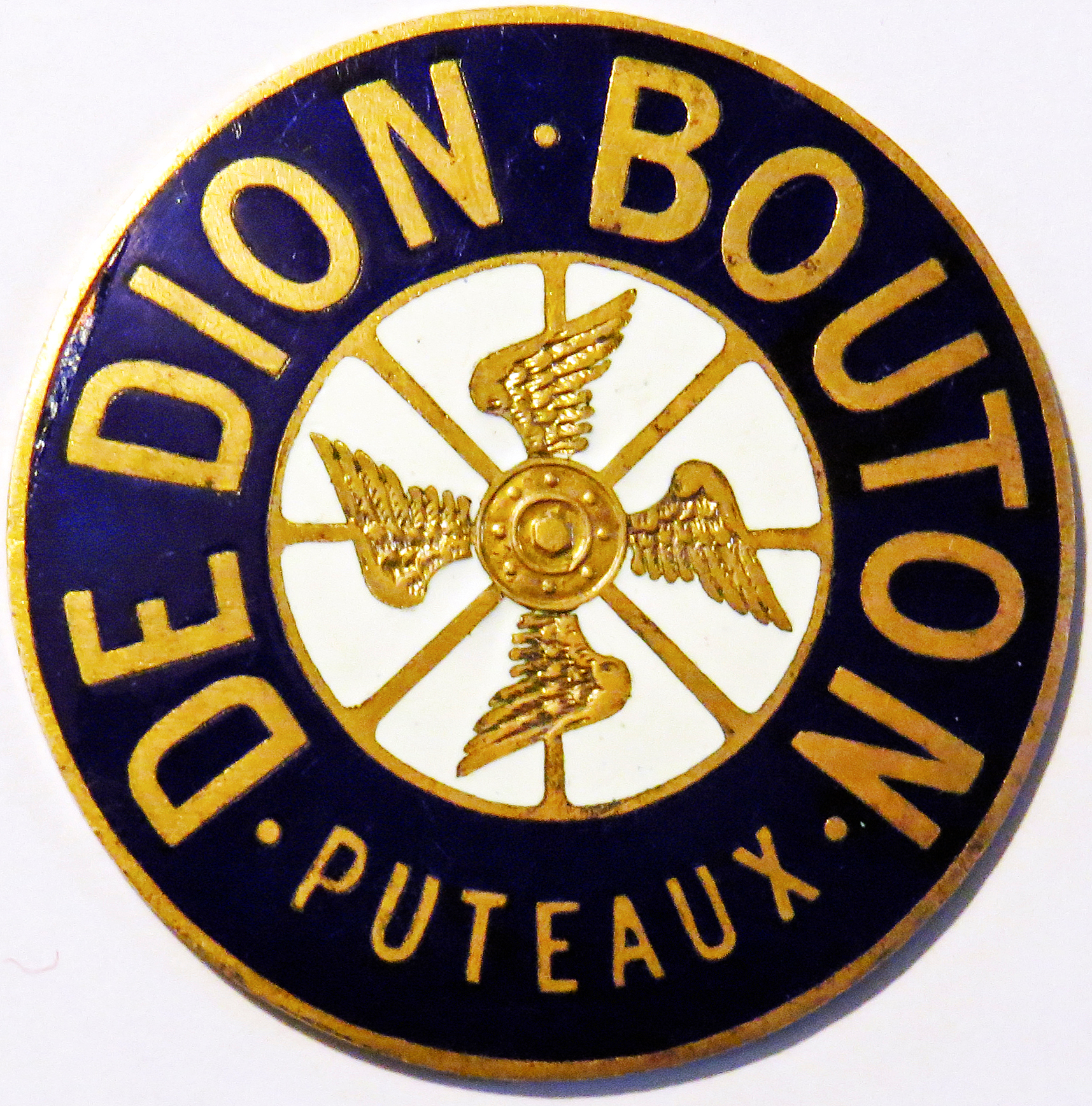
- Founded: 1883; 143 years ago
- Founders: Jules-Albert de Dion; Georges Bouton; Charles Trépardoux
- Headquarters: Puteaux, France
- Products: Automobiles and railcars

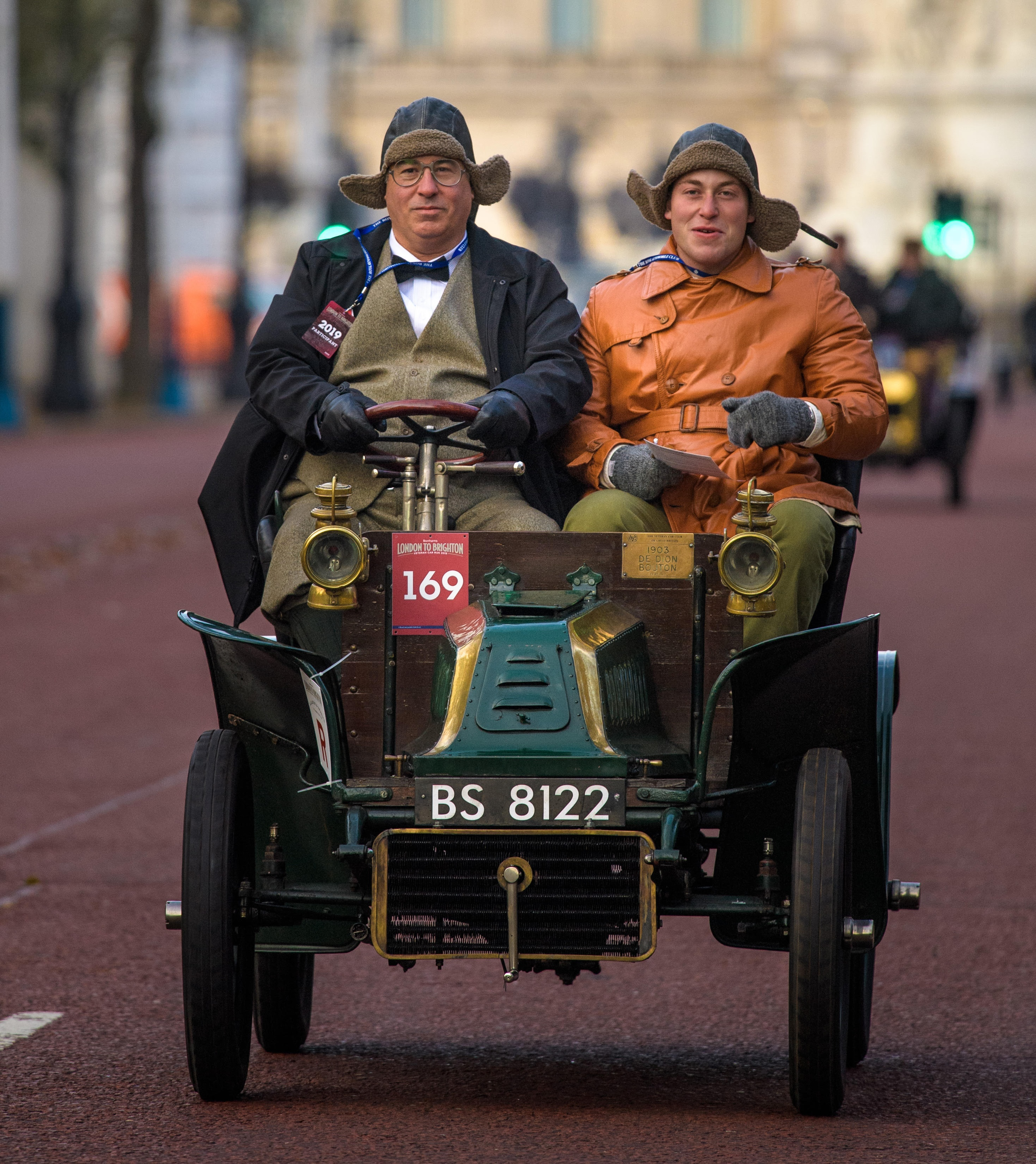
1903 De Dion Bouton Model Q at the London to Brighton Rally

De Dion-Bouton was a French automobile manufacturer and railcar manufacturer, which operated from 1883 to 1953. The company was founded by the Marquis Jules-Albert de Dion, Georges Bouton, and Bouton's brother-in-law Charles-Armand Trépardoux.

== Steam cars ==
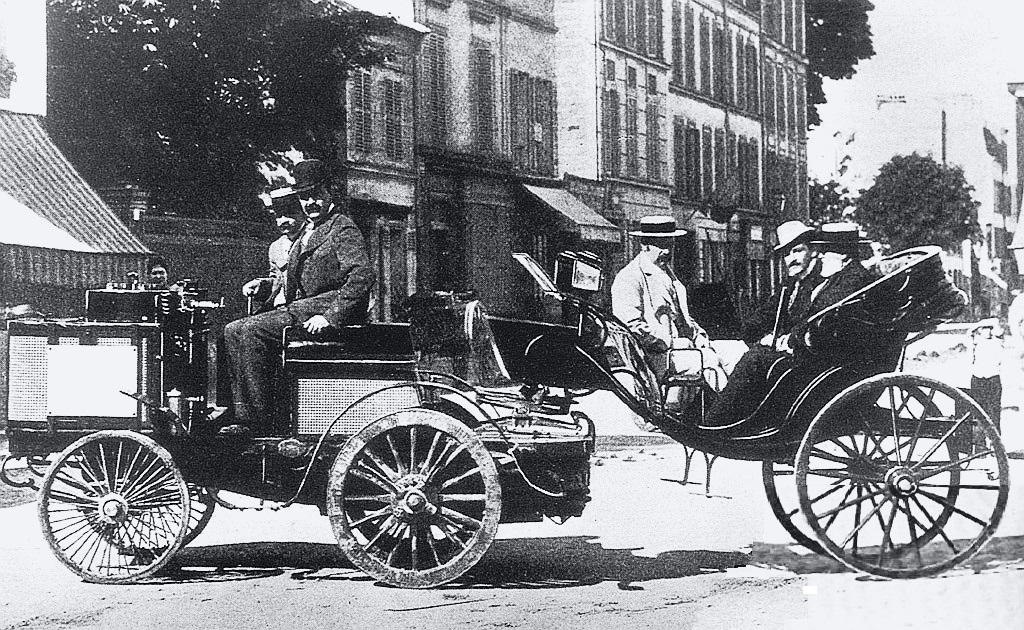
De Dion steam car in Paris–Rouen race of 1894

The company was formed in 1883 after de Dion saw a toy locomotive in a store window in 1881 and asked the toymakers to build another. Engineers Bouton and Trépardoux had been eking out a living with scientific toys at a shop in the Passage de Léon, near the rue de la Chapelle in Paris. Trépardoux had long dreamed of building a steam car, but neither he nor Bouton could afford it.

De Dion, already inspired by steam in the form of railway locomotives, and with ample money, agreed to back them, and Trépardoux et Cie was formed in Paris in 1883. That became the De Dion-Bouton automobile company, the world's largest automobile manufacturer for a time, well known for the quality, reliability, and durability of their vehicles.

Before 1883 was over, the company had set up shop in larger premises in the Passage de Léon, Paris, tried and dropped steam engines for boats, and produced a steam car. With the boiler and engine mounted at the front, driving the front wheels by belts and steering with the rear, it burned to the ground on trials. A second, La Marquise, was built the next year, with a more conventional steering and rear-wheel drive, capable of seating four.

The Marquis de Dion entered one of them in an 1887 trial, "Europe's first motoring competition", the brainchild of one M. Fossier of cycling magazine Le Vélocipède. Evidently, the promotion was insufficient, because De Dion was the sole entrant. It completed the course, with de Dion at the tiller, and was clocked at 60 km/h (37 mph). That figure must be viewed with considerable care, because the first official land speed record, set in 1898, was 63.15 km/h (39.24 mph). The vehicle survives, is in road-worthy condition, and has been a regular entry in the London to Brighton Veteran Car Run.

Following that singular success, the company offered steam tricycles, with boilers between the front wheels and two-cylinder engines. They were built in small numbers, and were evidently a favorite of young playboys. They were later joined by a larger tractor, able to pull trailers (sometimes called a "steam drag"). That larger vehicle introduced the so-called De Dion or "dead" axle. An axle beam carried the weight of the vehicle with the non-weight-bearing driveshafts or drive chains articulated separately alongside it. (Note: The live axle carries the weight by a rigid tube around the driveshaft, both parts fastened together.)

On 22 July 1894, during the Paris–Rouen race, it averaged 18.7 km/h (11.6 mph) over the 126 km (78 mi) route, but was disqualified because it needed both a driver and a stoker.

Two more cars were made in 1885, followed by a series of lightweight two-cylinder tricars which, from 1892, had Michelin pneumatic tyres. In 1893, steam tractors were introduced which were designed to tow horse-drawn carriages for passengers or freight (sometimes called "steam drags") which used an innovative axle design that became known as the De Dion tube, where the location and drive function of the axle are separated.

The company manufactured steam buses and trucks until 1904. Trépardoux, a staunch supporter of steam, resigned in 1894 as the company turned to internal combustion vehicles. However, the steam car remained in production more or less unchanged for ten years more.

== Internal combustion engines ==
=== Tricycles ===
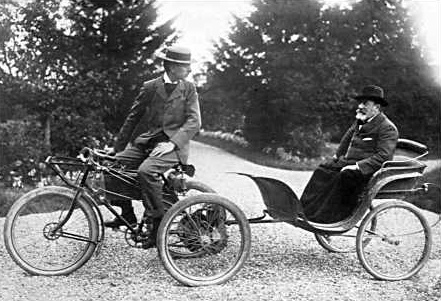
De Dion-Bouton tricycle towing a passenger in a carriage

By 1889, de Dion was becoming convinced the future lay in the internal combustion engine, and the company had built a ten-cylinder two-row rotary engine. After Trépardoux resigned in 1894, the company became De Dion, Bouton et Compagnie. For 1895, Bouton created a new 137 cc (8.4 cu in) one-cylinder engine with trembler coil ignition. Proving troublesome at its designed speed of 900 rpm (throwing bearings and running rough), when Bouton increased the revs, the problems vanished. In trials, it achieved an unprecedented 3500 rpm, and was usually run at 2,000 rpm, a limit imposed by its atmospheric valves and surface carburettor. Inlet and exhaust valves were overhead, and a flywheel was fitted to each end of the crankshaft.

This engine was fitted behind the rear axle of a tricycle frame bought from Decauville, fitted with the new Michelin pneumatic tires. It showed superb performance, and went on the market in 1896 with the engine enlarged to 1¼ CV (horsepower) (932 W) 185 cc (11.3 cu in), with 1¾ CV (1.3 kW) in 1897. By the time production of the petite voiture tricar stopped in 1901, it had 2¾ CV (2 kW), while racers had as much as 8 CV (6 kW).

In 1898, Louis Renault had a De Dion-Bouton modified with fixed drive shaft and ring and pinion gear, making "perhaps the first hot rod in history".

=== Four wheelers ===
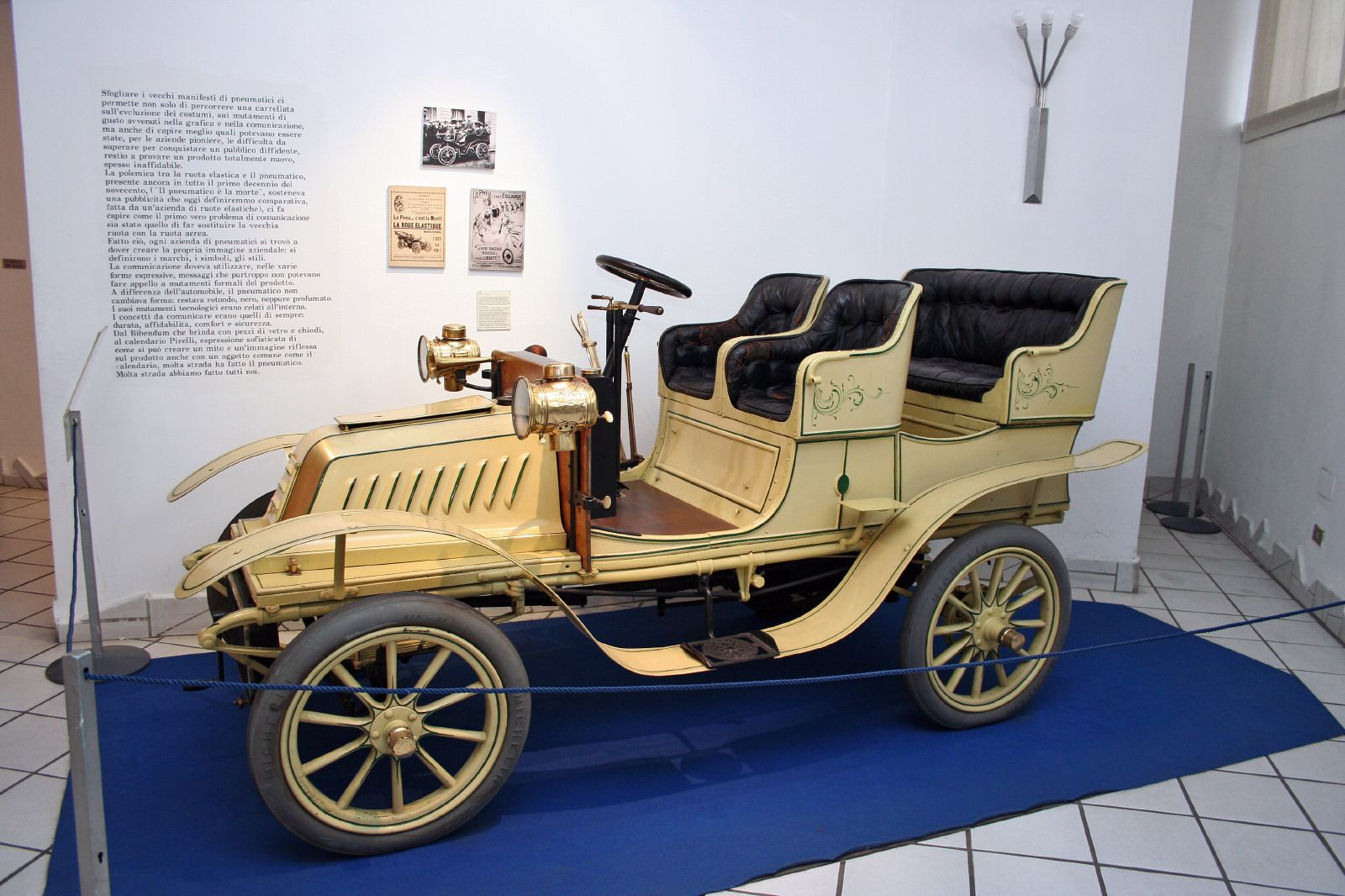
1903 De Dion & Bouton 8 CV in the Museo Nazionale dell'Automobile, Turin

The same year, the tricar was joined by a four-wheeler and in 1900 by a vis a vis voiturette, the Model D, with its 3¾ CV (2.8 kW) 402 cc (24.5 cu in) single-cylinder engine under the seat and drive to the rear wheels through a two-speed gearbox. This curious design had the passenger facing the driver, who sat in the rear seat. The voiturette had one inestimable advantage: the expanding clutches of the gearbox were operated by a lever on the steering column. The Model D was developed through Models E, G, I, and J, with 6 CV (4.5 kW) by 1902, when the 8 CV (6 kW) Model K rear-entry phaeton appeared, with front-end styling resembling the contemporary Renault. Until World War I, De Dion-Boutons had an unusual decelerator pedal which reduced engine speed and ultimately applied a transmission brake. In 1902, the Model O introduced three speeds, which was standard for all De Dion-Boutons in 1904.

A small number of electric cars were also made in 1901.

=== Engine supplier to automobile manufacturers ===
De Dion-Bouton supplied engines to vehicle manufacturers such as Hanzer and Société Parisienne who mounted a 2.5 horsepower (1.9 kW) unit directly on the front axle of their front-wheel-drive voiturette the 'Viktoria Combination'.

== Engine supplier to motor bicycle builders ==
The De Dion-Bouton engine is considered the first high-speed lightweight internal combustion engine. It was licensed to more than 150 manufacturers and was a popular choice among assemblers of motor bicycles. The small, lightweight four-cycle engine used a battery and coil ignition that was less trouble than hot tube ignition. The bore of 50 mm (2.0 in) and stroke of 70 mm (2.8 in) gave the engine an output of 1 kW (1.3 hp). It was used on many pioneering motor bicycles, and was widely copied by makers including US Brands Indian and Harley-Davidson.

== American De Dion ==
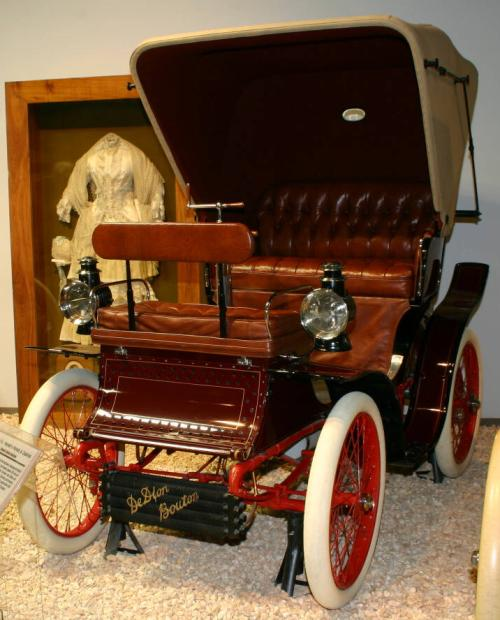
1901 De Dion-Bouton made in the United States

In 1900, the De Dion-Bouton Motorette Company began manufacturing De Dion-Bouton automobiles under license in Brooklyn, New York. A small quantity of American De Dion Motorettes were made. They had either two-seater vis-a-vis or closed coachwork, and were powered by a 3.5 horsepower (2.6 kW) American-made engines.

The venture was in operation for only one year, and the cars gained a reputation for unreliability during that time. Representatives of De Dion in the United States claimed that the licensee had violated the contract and advertised for a new licensee.

== Expansion ==
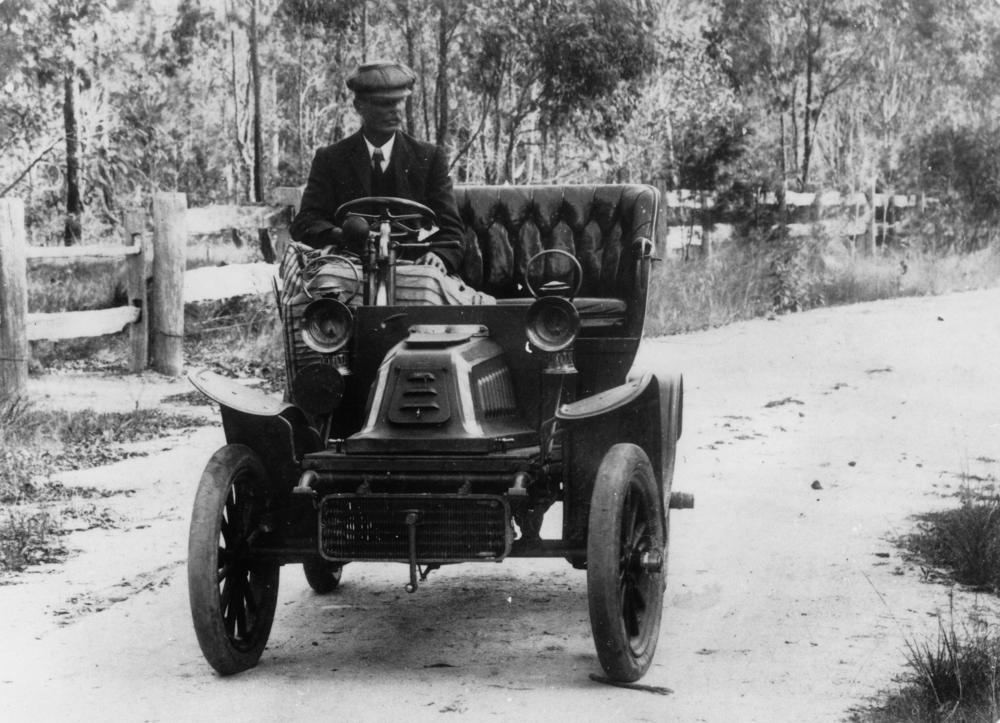
A De Dion-Bouton in 1905

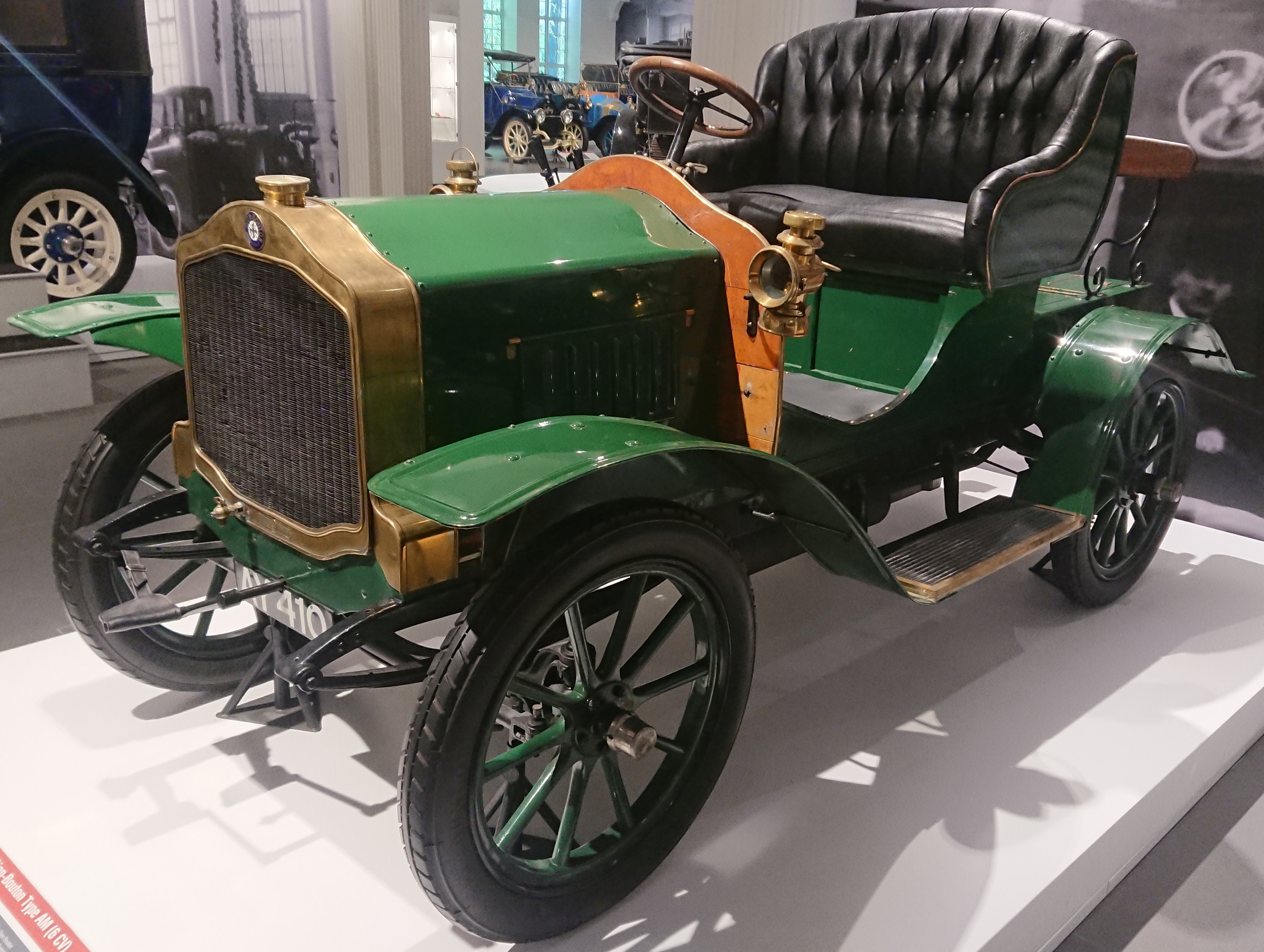
1906 De Dion-Bouton Type AM (6 CV)

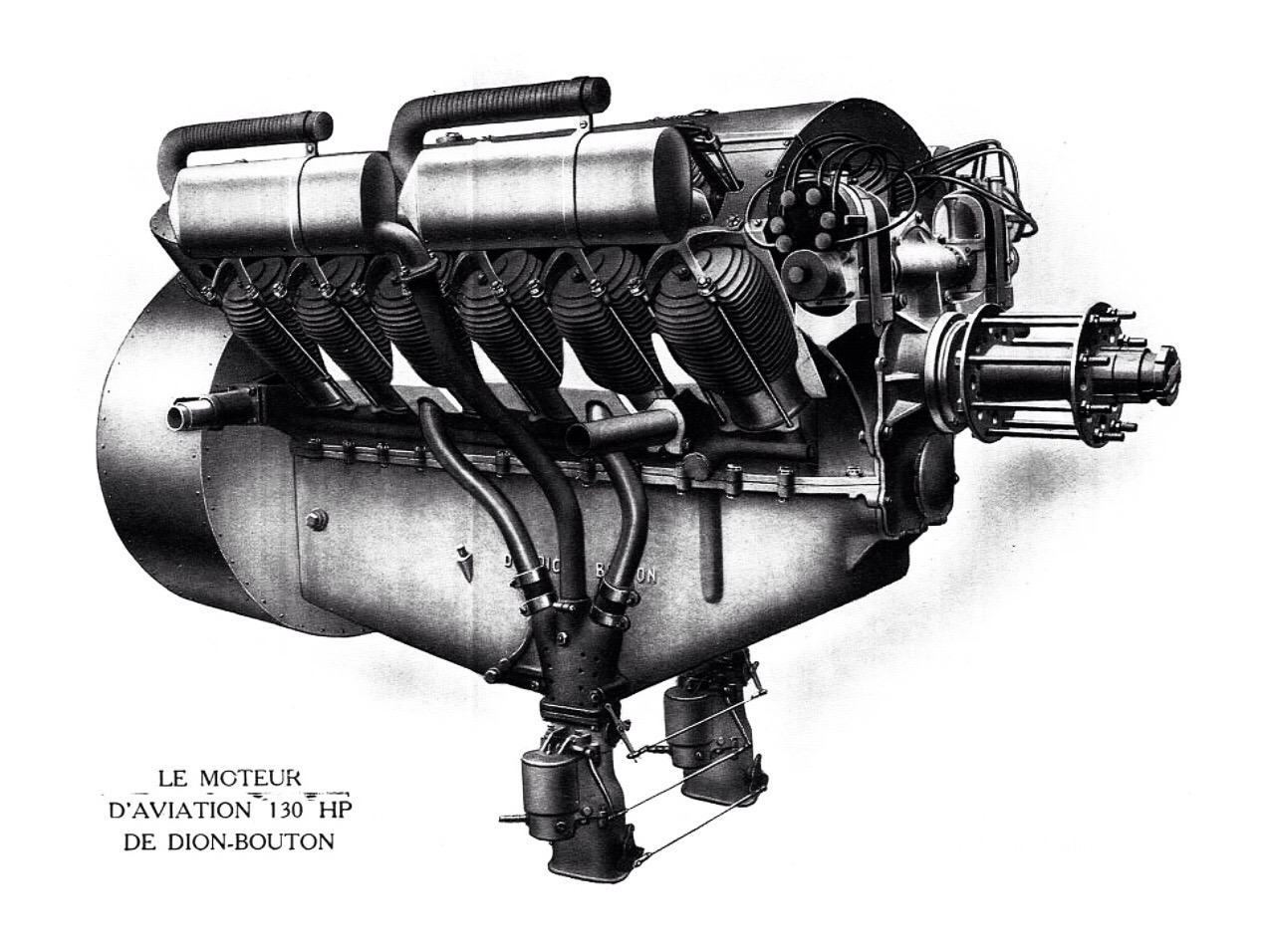
De Dion-Bouton aircraft engine twelve-cylinder 130 hp 13343 cc (1914)

In 1900, De Dion-Bouton was the second largest automobile manufacturer in the world after Locomobile, producing 400 cars and 3,200 engines. The company soon began producing engines and licenses for other automobile companies, with an estimate of 150 makes using them. Production was so great, that it proved impossible to test every engine. If one failed on the bench, it was simply disassembled. Every engine was being made by hand because the assembly line had not yet been introduced. By 1904, some 40,000 engines had been supplied across Europe. That year, De Dion-Bouton's factory at Quai National (now Quai de Dion-Bouton), Puteaux, employed 1,300 people and produced more than 2,000 cars, all hand-made.

The engine moved to the front in 1903 in the Populaire, which had a 700 or 942 cc (42.7 or 57.5 cu in) engine, the latter being powerful enough to allow trucks to be added to cars, and by the end of the year, a reverse gear had also appeared. It was joined by the 6 CV (4 kW) 864 cc (52.5 in^{3}) Types N and Q (the latter a low-priced K), the 8 CV (6 kW) R, and their first multi-cylinder model, the two-cylinder 1728 cc (105 in^{3}) 12 CV (8 kW) S, followed in 1904 by the four-cylinder 2,545 cc (155.3 cu in) 15 CV (11 kW) Type AD and 24 CV (18 kW) AI. The cars were also becoming more and more conventional in styling, with the radiator moving in front of the engine and the clutch changing from a hand lever to a pedal.

A pair of works 10 CV (7.5 kW) De Dion-Boutons, in the hands of Cormier and Collignon, ran in the 1907 Peking to Paris rally, without success. Bouvier St. Chaffray did no better in the New York to Paris in 1908. That year, De Dion-Bouton peaked as a manufacturer.

The company became the first to make a successful mass-produced V8 engine, a 35 CV (26 kW) 6,107 cc (372.7 cu in) CJ in 1910, followed by a 7.8 liter and a 14.7 liter for the U.S., as well as by a 3,534 cc (215.7 cu in) Type CN in 1912. (They trailed Ader in racing the 1906 Adams, which used an Antoinette aircraft engine.) This would be the company's last innovation.

During World War I, the company made gun parts, armoured vehicles, and aircraft engines, as well as cars and trucks. Between 1913 and 1918, it produced an anti-aircraft weapons system for the French Army, consisting of a Canon de 75 modèle 1897 field gun mounted on a V8-powered De Dion-Bouton truck.

In Dublin, during the Easter Rising of 1916, which began the Irish War of Independence, The O'Rahilly drove his De Dion Bouton up to the Irish HQ in O'Connell Street and, discovering that the Rising he had planned and trained soldiers for, and then tried to prevent, was actually happening, he drove it into a barricade, walked into the GPO and said: "I've helped to wind the clock, I've come to hear it strike." He was killed in a charge against a machine gun nest in Moore Street days later. A famous photograph shows the skeleton of the car in its barricade.

== Postwar stagnation ==
The company stagnated after World War I. The V8 continued to appear until 1923 and, in spite of new models with front-wheel brakes, the factory closed for much of 1927. On reopening, two models were listed, the Type LA, with a 1,982 cc (120.9 cu in) four-cylinder overhead valve, aluminium-piston engine, and the Type LB, with a 2,496 cc (152.3 cu in) straight-8. The latter was very expensive and sales were few, despite an increase in engine size growth to 3 litres (180 cu in) in 1930. A rumored takeover by Peugeot or Mercedes did not materialize, leading to the end of passenger car production in 1932.

== After World War II ==
Small numbers of commercial vehicles were made until 1950, and the last vehicles to carry the De Dion badge were license-made Land Rovers in the early 1950s. The company name was bought by a motorcycle maker in 1955.

== Railcars ==
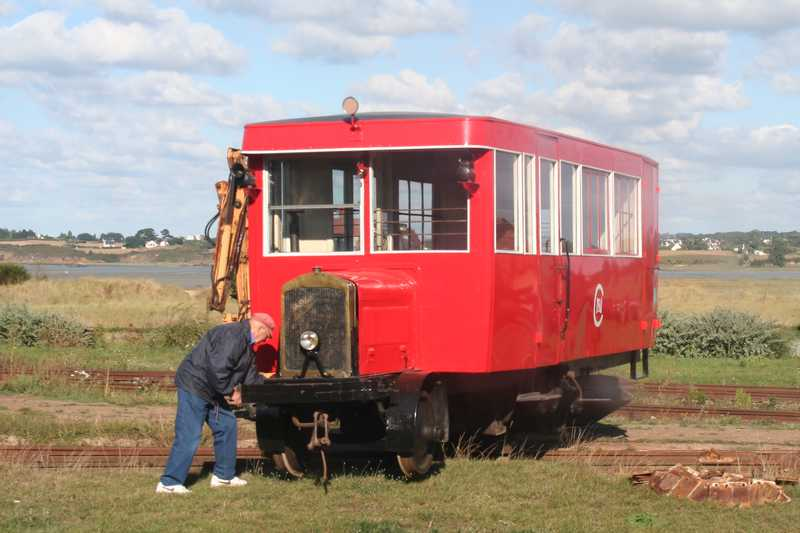
De Dion-Bouton JM4 railcar

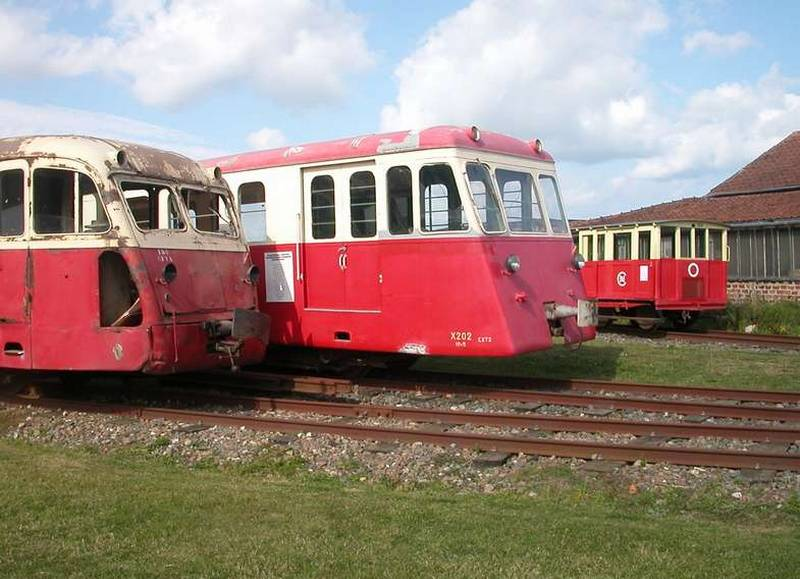
De Dion-Bouton OC1 and OC2 railcars (foreground)

De Dion-Bouton built railcars and railcar trailers used on many of the metre gauge railways in France and abroad. The first railcars were produced in the early 1920s, with the Chemin de Fer des Côtes-du-Nord receiving its first vehicles in 1923.

== Sources ==
- Georgano, G. N. (1990). Cars: Early and Vintage, 1886–1930. London: Grange-Universal. (reprints AB Nordbok 1985 edition).
- Wise, David Burgess (1974). "De Dion: The Aristocrat and the Toymaker". In Ward, Ian (ed.). The World of Automobiles. Vol. 5. London: Orbis Publishing. pp. 510–4.
