= List of Tour de France Grands Départs =

The Tour de France is an annual road bicycle race held over 23 days in July. Established in 1903 by newspaper L'Auto, the Tour is the most well-known and prestigious of cycling's three "Grand Tours"; the others are the Giro d'Italia and the Vuelta a España. The race usually covers approximately 3,500 kilometres (2,200 mi), passing through France and neighbouring countries such as Belgium. The race is broken into day-long segments, called stages. Individual finishing times for each stage are totalled to determine the overall winner at the end of the race.

The course changes every year, almost always finishing in Paris; since 1975 (except for 2024) it has finished along the Champs-Élysées. The start of the course is known as the Grand Départ. Since the 1950s it has typically taken place in a different town each year, and since the 1970s it has been common to award the Grand Départ to cities outside France as a way of increasing international interest in the competition and the sport. In all, the Grand Départ has occurred outside France 26 times: 13 times in the Low Countries, 4 times in Germany, and 9 times elsewhere. The right to host the Grand Départ is now highly sought after, with cities bidding to host, and has been shown to increase economic activity as well as interest in cycling in the host area.

In recent years, cities outside France have paid organisers Amaury Sport Organisation around €6 million to host the Grand Départ. French cities pay less, with Brest paying €3.6 million in 2021 and Lille paying €4.2 million in 2025.

In 2024, the first Grand Départ outside France for the Tour de France Femmes took place in Rotterdam, Netherlands.

== Host cities ==
=== Tour de France ===
Tour de France Grands Départs hosts
Year	Country	Region	Grand Départ host
1903	France	Île-de-France	Montgeron
1904	France	Île-de-France	Montgeron
1905	France	Île-de-France	Noisy-le-Grand
1906	France	Île-de-France	Neuilly-sur-Seine (Vélodrome Buffalo)
1907	France	Île-de-France	Neuilly-sur-Seine (Pont Bineau)
1908	France	Île-de-France	Neuilly-sur-Seine (Pont Bineau)
1909	France	Île-de-France	Neuilly-sur-Seine (Pont de la Jatte)
1910	France	Île-de-France	Neuilly-sur-Seine (Pont de la Jatte)
1911	France	Île-de-France	Neuilly-sur-Seine (Pont de la Jatte)
1912	France	Île-de-France	Paris (Luna Park Porte Maillot)
1913	France	Île-de-France	Boulogne-Billancourt
1914	France	Île-de-France	Saint-Cloud
1915	—	—	—
1916	—	—	—
1917	—	—	—
1918	—	—	—
1919	France	Île-de-France	Paris (Parc des Princes)
1920	France	Île-de-France	Argenteuil
1921	France	Île-de-France	Argenteuil
1922	France	Île-de-France	Paris (Luna Park Porte Maillot)
1923	France	Île-de-France	Paris (Luna Park Porte Maillot)
1924	France	Île-de-France	Paris (Luna Park Porte Maillot)
1925	France	Île-de-France	Le Vésinet
1926	France	Rhône-Alpes	Évian-les-Bains
1927	France	Île-de-France	Le Vésinet
1928	France	Île-de-France	Le Vésinet
1929	France	Île-de-France	Le Vésinet
1930	France	Île-de-France	Le Vésinet
1931	France	Île-de-France	Le Vésinet
1932	France	Île-de-France	Le Vésinet
1933	France	Île-de-France	Le Vésinet
1934	France	Île-de-France	Le Vésinet
1935	France	Île-de-France	Le Vésinet
1936	France	Île-de-France	Le Vésinet
1937	France	Île-de-France	Le Vésinet
1938	France	Île-de-France	Le Vésinet
1939	France	Île-de-France	Le Vésinet
1940	—	—	—
1941	—	—	—
1942	—	—	—
1943	—	—	—
1944	—	—	—
1945	—	—	—
1946	—	—	—
1947	France	Île-de-France	Paris
1948	France	Île-de-France	Paris
1949	France	Île-de-France	Paris
1950	France	Île-de-France	Paris
1951	France	Lorraine	Metz
1952	France	Brittany	Brest
1953	France	Alsace	Strasbourg
1954	Netherlands	North Holland	Amsterdam
1955	France	Upper Normandy	Le Havre
1956	France	Champagne-Ardenne	Reims
1957	France	Pays de la Loire	Nantes
1958	Belgium	Brussels-Capital Region	Brussels
1959	France	Alsace	Mulhouse
1960	France	Nord-Pas-de-Calais	Lille
1961	France	Upper Normandy	Rouen
1962	France	Lorraine	Nancy
1963	France	Île-de-France	Paris
1964	France	Brittany	Rennes
1965	West Germany	North Rhine-Westphalia	Cologne
1966	France	Lorraine	Nancy
1967	France	Pays de la Loire	Angers
1968	France	Lorraine	Vittel
1969	France	Nord-Pas-de-Calais	Roubaix
1970	France	Limousin	Limoges
1971	France	Alsace	Mulhouse
1972	France	Pays de la Loire	Angers
1973	Netherlands	South Holland	Scheveningen
1974	France	Brittany	Brest
1975	Belgium	Wallonia	Charleroi
1976	France	Pays de la Loire	Saint-Jean-de-Monts
1977	France	Midi-Pyrénées	Fleurance
1978	Netherlands	South Holland	Leiden
1979	France	Midi-Pyrénées	Fleurance
1980	West Germany	Hesse	Frankfurt
1981	France	Provence-Alpes-Côte d'Azur	Nice
1982	Switzerland	Basel-Stadt	Basel
1983	France	Île-de-France	Fontenay-sous-Bois
1984	France	Île-de-France	Montreuil
1985	France	Brittany	Plumelec
1986	France	Île-de-France	Boulogne-Billancourt
1987	West Germany	West Berlin	West Berlin
1988	France	Pays de la Loire	Pontchâteau
1989	Luxembourg	Luxembourg District	Luxembourg City
1990	France	Poitou-Charentes	Futuroscope
1991	France	Rhône-Alpes	Lyon
1992	Spain	(Basque Country (autonomous community)) Basque Country	San Sebastián
1993	France	Pays de la Loire	Le Puy du Fou
1994	France	Nord-Pas-de-Calais	Lille
1995	France	Brittany	Saint-Brieuc
1996	Netherlands	North Brabant	's-Hertogenbosch
1997	France	Upper Normandy	Rouen
1998	Ireland	Leinster	Dublin
1999	France	Pays de la Loire	Le Puy du Fou
2000	France	Poitou-Charentes	Futuroscope
2001	France	Nord-Pas-de-Calais	Dunkirk
2002	Luxembourg	Luxembourg District	Luxembourg City
2003	France	Île-de-France	Paris
2004	Belgium	Wallonia	Liège
2005	France	Pays de la Loire	Challans
2006	France	Alsace	Strasbourg
2007	United Kingdom	Greater London	London
2008	France	Brittany	Brest
2009	Monaco	Monaco	Monaco
2010	Netherlands	South Holland	Rotterdam
2011	France	Pays de la Loire	Passage du Gois
2012	Belgium	Wallonia	Liège
2013	France	Corsica	Porto-Vecchio
2014	United Kingdom	Yorkshire	Leeds
2015	Netherlands	(Utrecht (province)) Utrecht	Utrecht
2016	France	Normandy	Mont Saint-Michel
2017	Germany	North Rhine-Westphalia	Düsseldorf
2018	France	Pays de la Loire	Noirmoutier-en-l'Île
2019	Belgium	Brussels-Capital Region	Brussels
2020	France	Provence-Alpes-Côte d'Azur	Nice
2021	France	Brittany	Brest
2022	Denmark	Capital Region of Denmark	Copenhagen
2023	Spain	(Basque Country (autonomous community)) Basque Country	Bilbao
2024	Italy	Tuscany	Florence
2025	France	Hauts-de-France	Lille
2026	Spain	Catalonia	Barcelona
2027	United Kingdom	Lothian	Edinburgh
2028	France	Grand Est	Reims

=== Tour de France Femmes ===
Year	Country	Region	Grand Départ host
2022	France	Île-de-France	Paris
2023	France	Auvergne-Rhône-Alpes	Clermont-Ferrand
2024	Netherlands	South Holland	Rotterdam
2025	France	Brittany	Vannes
2026	Switzerland	Vaud	Lausanne
2027	United Kingdom	Yorkshire	Leeds

== Countries outside France that have hosted the Grands Départ ==
Countries outside France that have hosted the men's Grands Départ
No.	Country	Cities
6	Netherlands	s-Hertogenbosch, Amsterdam, Leiden, Rotterdam, Scheveningen, Utrecht
5	Belgium	Brussels (2), Liège (2), Charleroi
4	Germany inc. West Germany	Cologne, Düsseldorf, Frankfurt, West Berlin
3	Spain	Barcelona, Bilbao, San Sebastian
2	Luxembourg	Luxembourg City (2)
2	United Kingdom	Leeds, London, Edinburgh (future)
1	Denmark	Copenhagen
1	Ireland	Dublin
1	Italy	Florence
1	Monaco	Monte Carlo
1	Switzerland	Basel

Countries outside France that have hosted the women's Grands Départ
No.	Country	Cities
1	Netherlands	Rotterdam
1	Switzerland	Lausanne
0	United Kingdom	Leeds (future)

== Bibliography ==
- Jacques Augendre (2012). Tour de France Guide Historique (PDF). Amaury Sport Organisation. Archived from the original (PDF) on 31 August 2017.
- "Memoire du Cyclisme" (in French). Memoire du Cyclisme.

== See also ==
- List of Tour de France secondary classification winners
- Yellow jersey statistics
- List of Grand Tour general classification winners
