= Marie-Odile Amaury =

French media executive (born 1940)

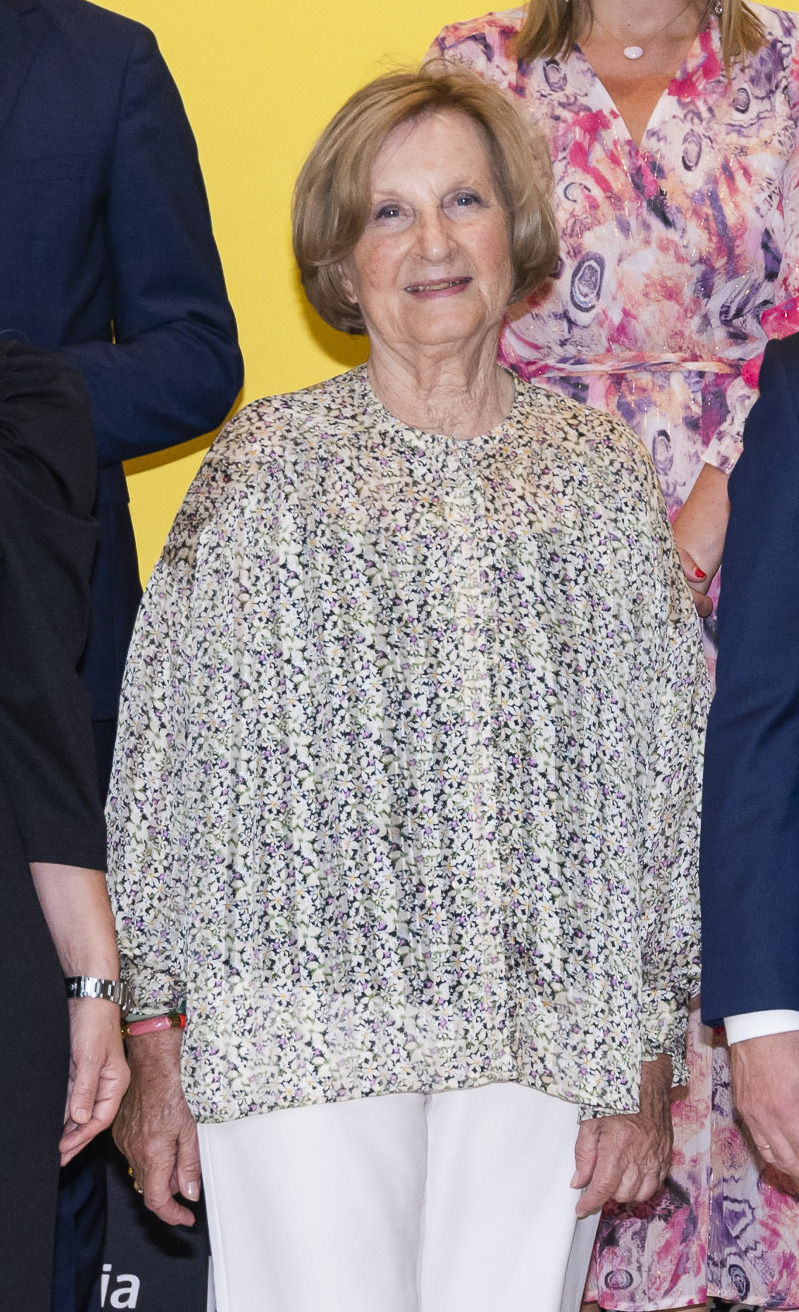
- Born: Marie-Odile Kuhn; Strasbourg
- Education: Centre universitaire d'enseignement du journalisme
- Occupation: Media executive
- Employer(s): VMLY&R; Le Poste parisien Havas; Éditions Philippe Amaury
- Spouse: Philippe Amaury
- Children: 1
- Awards: Chevalier de la Légion d'honneur (2011); Ordre national du Mérite (2019); Commandeure de l'ordre de la Couronne

Marie-Odile Amaury, née Kuhn (born 1940), is a prominent figure in the French business world.

== Biography ==
Marie-Odile Kuhn was born in Strasbourg, into a family from the Strasbourg bourgeoisie. Her father was an optician. She has a bachelor's degree in literature and a diploma from the Centre universitaire d'enseignement du journalisme in Strasbourg.

She met Philippe Amaury in the mid-1960s and married him in 1969.

After her husband's death in 2006 at the age of 65, she took over the Amaury Group to preserve it for her children, who had recently joined the group. She became the chairman and chief executive officer, notably deciding to refocus the company on sports by selling Le Parisien libéré to LVMH in 2015. In the sports domain, the Amaury Group owns L'Équipe and A.S.O., which organizes sporting events, including the Tour de France. In 2020, Marie-Odile Amaury led this group during the COVID-19 pandemic, trying to manage the consequences of this global health crisis in the sports domain.

== Decorations ==
- Commander of the French National Order of Merit. She was promoted to Commander on 3 December 2019, after having been directly appointed Officer on 14 November 2008.
- Knight of the French Legion of Honneur. She was appointed Knight on 30 December 2011.
- Commander of the Belgian Order of the Crown
