= Théodore Vienne =

French textile manufacturer

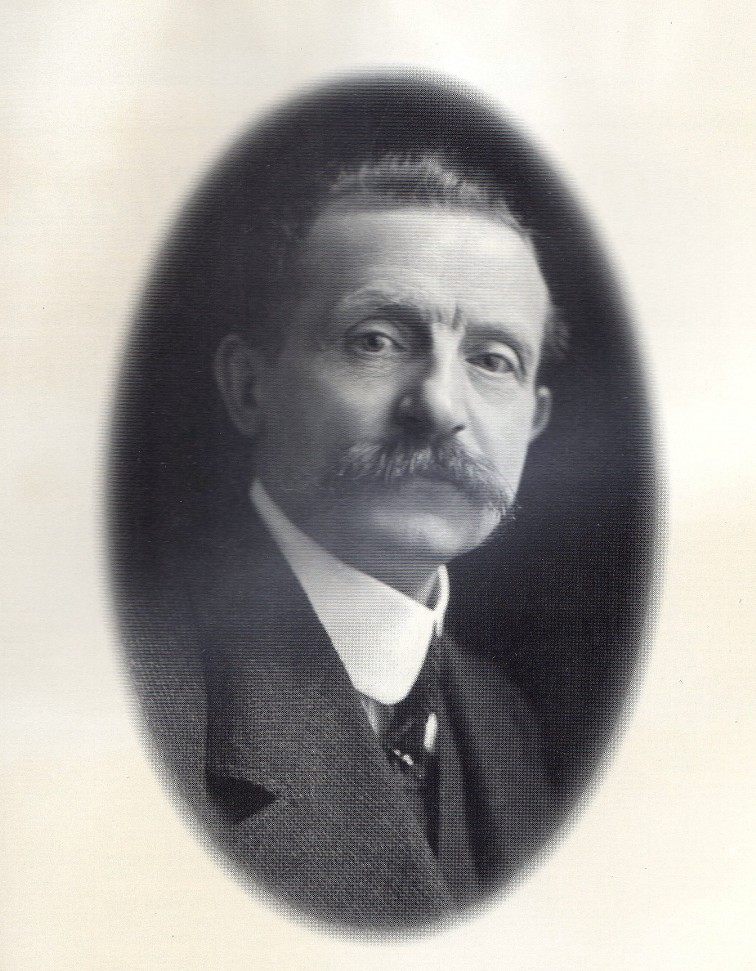
Théo Vienne, Roubaix textile manufacturer and co-founder of Paris–Roubaix cycle race

Théodore Vienne, also known as Théo Vienne, (28 July 1864 – 1 March 1921) was a textile manufacturer in Roubaix who with Maurice Perez founded the Paris–Roubaix cycle race in 1896 (One of the oldest cycle races in the world. (Note: The oldest cycle race that is still 'alive' is Liège–Bastogne–Liège, founded in 1892.)).

Vienne was born in Roubaix France on 28 July 1864. He was a sports entrepreneur, building Roubaix velodrome and the town's bullfighting ring. He also promoted Greco-Roman wrestling, professional boxing and billiards. He was described by the New York Times as "the leading fight promoter of France." He owned the Grande Roue de Paris (then the largest Ferris wheel in the world) and founded the 'Wonderland Français' sports arena in Luna Park, Paris.

== Family ==
Vienne's father, Emmanuel Ignace Vienne, was born in Lille, on 23 April 1824. He died in Roubaix on 11 April 1873. His mother, Elisa Marie Joseph Lesur was born in Tourcoing on 24 November 1825 and died in Roubaix in 1878. His grandfather, Jean Baptiste Vienne, was born at Menin around 1786 and died at Ghent, Belgium, on 12 January 1830. His grandmother, Léocadie Potteuw, was born at Gheluwe, Belgium, in 1786 and died in Roubaix on 20 April 1859. Théodore Vienne was married in Bondues on 26 November 1887 to Louise Marie Crepel, who was born in Bondues on 21 January 1865.

== Background ==
Roubaix, a town and now a suburb of Lille on the Belgian border of northern France, was a fast-growing industrial town in the 19th century. (Note: The population of Roubaix rose from 8,500 in 1800 to 16,000 in 1840 and to 125,000 by 1890.) Its politics were strongly socialist and its mayor, Henri Carette, was the first Collectivist mayor in the country. His campaigns for a better life for workers included encouraging sports events. The Fédération Cyclopèdique du Nord was founded on 8 March 1890 as part of his work.

The first races were held on paths in Barbieux park but they proved dangerous to participants and to walkers in the park. Théodore Vienne and his friend and business associate, Maurice Perez, both cyclists, had a mill in the rue du Pays in the town. They organised their first race in 1894. Its success led them to build Roubaix velodrome on 46,000 square metres at the corner of the rue Verte and the route d'Hempempont. (Note: The Roubaix velodrome was looted and damaged during World War 1, before being dismantled in 1922.) It opened on Sunday 9 June 1895 to shouts from the crowd of "Vive Roubaix!" It stood opposite a fashionable horse-racing society and beside a tramway to bring spectators from the centre of town. The track's suspended bankings were considered architecturally avant-garde.

Vienne — described as "immensely rich" — and Perez held several meetings on the track, one including the first appearance in France by the American sprinter Major Taylor, then looked for further ideas.

== Paris–Roubaix ==
In February 1896, they hit on holding a race from Paris to their track. It gave them two problems. The first was that the biggest races started or ended in Paris and that Roubaix would be seen as too provincial a destination. The second was that they could organise the start or the finish but not both. They spoke to Louis Minart, the editor of Le Vélo, the only daily sports paper. Minart was enthusiastic but said the decision of whether the paper would run the start and provide publicity belonged to the director, Paul Rousseau. Minart may also have suggested an indirect approach because the mill owners recommended their race not on its own merits but as preparation for another. They wrote:

Dear M. Rousseau, Bordeaux–Paris is approaching and this great annual event which has done so much to promote cycling has given us an idea. What would you think of a training race which preceded Bordeaux–Paris by four weeks? The distance between Paris and Roubaix is roughly 280km, so it would be child's play for the future participants of Bordeaux–Paris. The finish would take place at the Roubaix vélodrome after several laps of the track. Everyone would be assured of an enthusiastic welcome as most of our citizens have never had the privilege of seeing the spectacle of a major road race and we count on enough friends to believe that Roubaix is truly a hospitable town. As prizes we already have subscribed to a first prize of 1,000 francs in the name of the Roubaix velodrome and we will be busy establishing a generous prize list which will be to the satisfaction of all. But for the moment, can we count on the patronage of Le Vélo and on your support for organising the start?

The first prize represented seven months' wages for a miner. Rousseau was enthusiastic and sent his cycling editor, Victor Breyer, to find a route. Breyer travelled to Amiens in a Panhard driven by his colleague, Paul Meyan. The following morning Breyer — later deputy organiser of the Tour de France and a leading official of the Union Cycliste Internationale — continued by bike. The wind blew, the rain fell and the temperature dropped. Breyer reached Roubaix filthy and exhausted after a day of riding in disjointed cobbles. He swore he would send a telegram to Minart urging him to drop the idea, saying it was dangerous to send a race the way he had just ridden. But that evening a meal and drinks with the team from Roubaix changed his mind.

== Sports entrepreneur ==
Vienne was a successful textile industrialist — described as "fabulously rich" — and a sports entrepreneur, building not only the velodrome but a successful torodrome (bullfighting ring). On 14 July 1899, France's national day, a huge crowd attended a 'fight' between a lion and a bull, but it was a fiasco because the animals would not fight. He then started promoting Greco-Roman wrestling, professional boxing and billiards. His sports empire expanded and his promotional posters were prominent at the 1911 World's Fair in Paris.

== Other enterprises ==
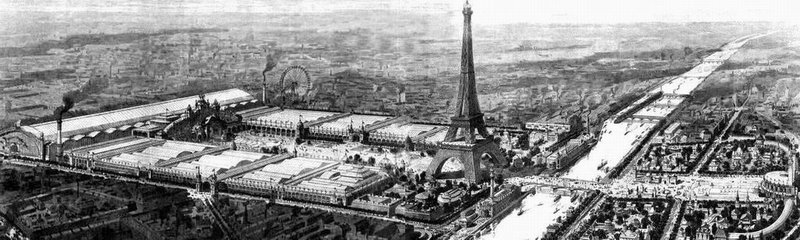
'Grande Roue de Paris' at the World exhibition in 1900

Vienne was director and owner of the Grande Roue de Paris, ('Great Wheel of Paris'), a 100m-high Ferris wheel built in 1900 for the world exhibition. It was demolished in 1920, but almost 100 years passed between its construction and a taller wheel being built.

In 1907, he founded the Wonderland Français with Robert Coquelle and Victor Breyer, a sports stadium at Luna Park, Paris. (Note: Robert Coquelle was a journalist and sports promoter. It was he who brought Major Taylor to race. He wrote for Le Vélo and La Vie au Grand Air. He was born around 1870 and died around 1930) The New York Times reported in 1913:

Jack Johnson, heavyweight champion, was matched to-day to fight Frank Moran in this city during the second week of January, 1914, for the heavyweight championship of the world. Two clubs, the Nouveau Cirque and the Wonderland Francais, are now bidding for the match, and the decision will be made known Saturday.

The Nouveau Cirque, which holds its bouts at the Velodrome d'Hiver in Passy, will seat 30,000 persons, and it has offered Johnson 50 percent of the gross receipts, with 25 percent for Moran. The Wonderland Club, which is under the control of Theodore Vienne, the leading fight promoter of France, will submit its bid tomorrow. It is said that both parties favor Vienne's club, as the fight would be held in Luna Park, Paris, thereby drawing a great society crowd.

== Death ==
Vienne died in the 15th arrondissement of Paris and is buried in the cimetière du Père-Lachaise in Paris although his name is not listed on official records.
