= Éditions Philippe Amaury =

French media group

- Company type: Private company
- Industry: Media
- Founders: Émilien Amaury; Philippe Amaury; Marie-Odile Amaury
- Headquarters: France
- Key people: Aurore Amaury (CEO)
- Owner: Amaury Family (privately held)
- Website: amaury.com

Éditions Philippe Amaury (EPA), also known as Groupe EPA or the Groupe Amaury, is a French private media group founded by Philippe Amaury (1940–2006) whose widow, Marie-Odile Amaury, owns a majority of the company. The CEO of the company is Aurore Amaury, daughter of Philippe and Marie-Odile Amaury.

In partnership with SNC L'Équipe, the group publishes the sports journals l'Équipe, l'Équipe Magazine, France Football and Vélo Magazine. EPA owns the television channel l'Équipe 21, which airs French and international sports competitions like road cycling, rally, motocross, basketball, ice hockey, volleyball, judo, biathlon and the European Games. In 1998, the group launched the L'Équipe television channel as an extension to the newspaper L'Équipe.

Its wholly owned subsidiary, Amaury Sport Organisation, is one of the largest promoters of sports events in France, including the Tour de France and Paris–Roubaix bicycle races, the Paris–Dakar Rally, the Paris Marathon and the Open de France golf tournament; as well as 250 days of competition per year, with 90 events in 30 countries.

EPA formerly owned le Parisien, a local newspaper in greater Paris, as well as its national edition, Aujourd'hui en France. LVMH acquired the papers in 2015.
