= Jean-Marie Leblanc =

French cyclist (born 1944)

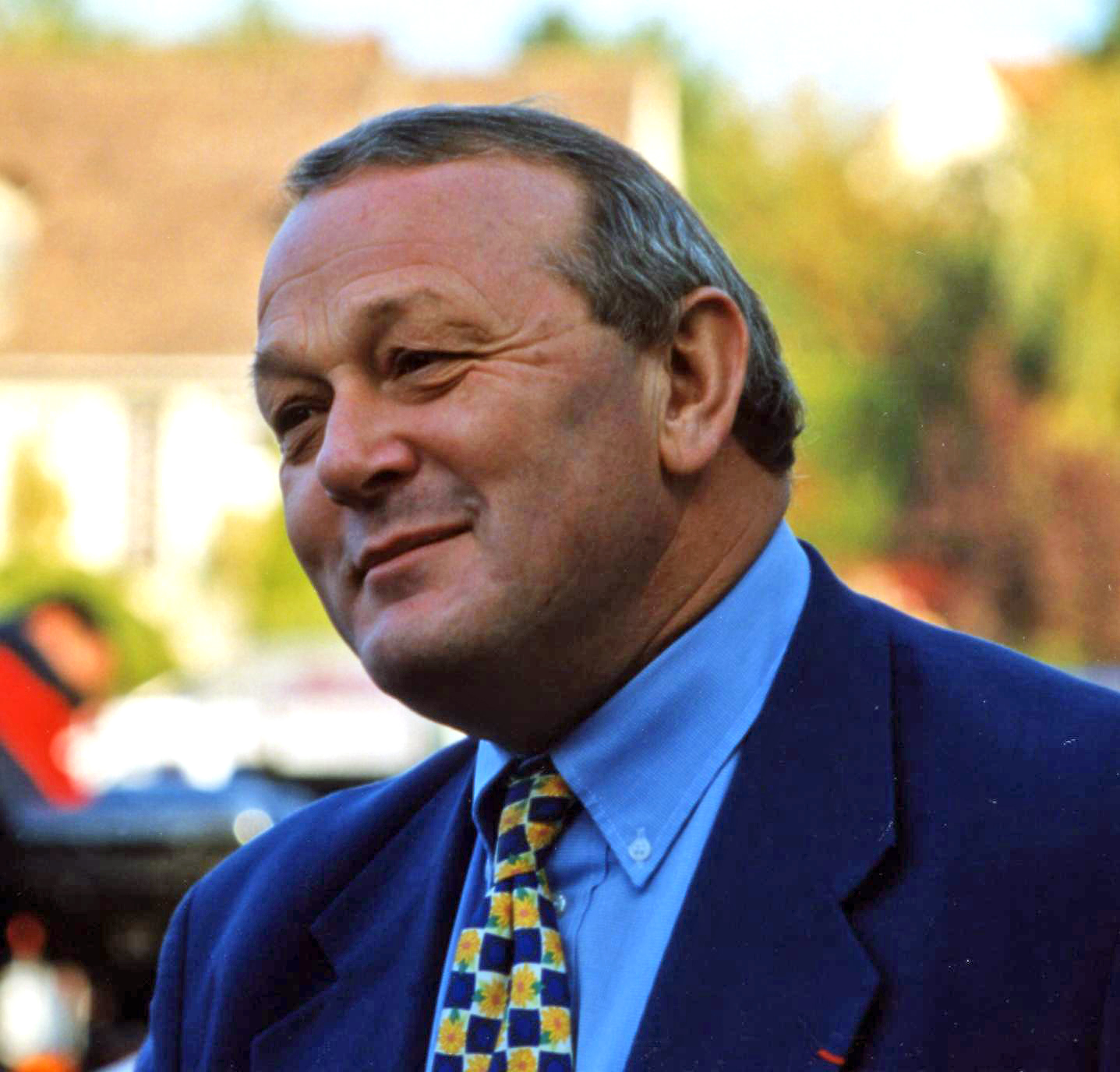
- Jean-Marie Leblanc during 1997 Paris–Tours
- Born: 27 July 1944 (age 81); Nueil-sur-Argent, France
- Occupation: Journalist
- Years active: 1989 – 2007
- Title: General director of the Tour de France
- Predecessor: Xavier Louy
- Successor: Christian Prudhomme

Jean-Marie Leblanc (born 27 July 1944) is a French retired professional road bicycle racer who was general director of the Tour de France from 1989 to 2007, when he reached pensionable age and was succeeded by Christian Prudhomme.

== Biography ==
Leblanc became a professional cyclist in 1966 and rode until 1971. He gained his best results in criteriums, small tours, and single stage races, like the Grand Prix d'Aix-en-Provence (1968, 1st), the Circuit d'Armorique (1969, 1st), and the Four Days of Dunkirk (1970, 2nd). Afterwards, he became a sports journalist, working for L'Équipe.

In 1989, Leblanc became general director of the Tour de France, replacing Xavier Louy. Under his aegis, the Tour was modernised, most notably with the abandonment of the red and combination jerseys. Revenues were increased, as large numbers of sponsors were replaced by a limited number of larger ones – as well as increased income from television rights.

During Leblanc's tenure as race director, doping was rife at the Tour, despite attempts to police teams and riders that broke the rules.

Leblanc was race director during the 1998 Tour de France, when a doping scandal, known as the Festina affair became public, with several teams and riders withdrawing from the race. Leblanc subsequently compared seven-time Tour winner Lance Armstrong to fraudster Bernie Madoff, after Armstrong admitted to doping during his career. In 2007, Leblanc retired and was succeeded by Christian Prudhomme, who had been Leblanc's assistant director at the Tour.

In 1989, Leblanc cancelled further running of Tour de France Féminin, citing the economic cost of organising the race with limited media coverage and sponsorship being generated. In the early 2000s, French cyclist Marion Clignet recalled asking if the organisers of Paris–Roubaix would organise a women's edition of the race, with Leblanc (who worked for the organisers) replying that they would not.

Leblanc was president of the AIOCC (Association Internationale des Organisateurs de Courses Cyclistes) from 1989 through 2004. In October 2007, he published his autobiography, Le Tour de ma Vie.

He took over from Jacques Duquesne as president of the JNP (Journalists Originating from Nord-Pas de Calais). Every Christmas it awards the 'Trophy of light' to whoever has best served the region that year. Every Spring it awards the 'Golden Pen' to the author of the best article of the region.

Leblanc is a fan of classical music and jazz and plays the clarinet. His ambition to play Mozart's clarinet concerto with an orchestra was realised on 27 June 2008 when he played at the Salle Philharmonique du Conservatoire de Liège (Belgium), with the Liège Philharmonic Orchestra conducted by Jean-Pierre Haeck.
