= Géo Lefèvre =

French sports journalist (1877–1961)

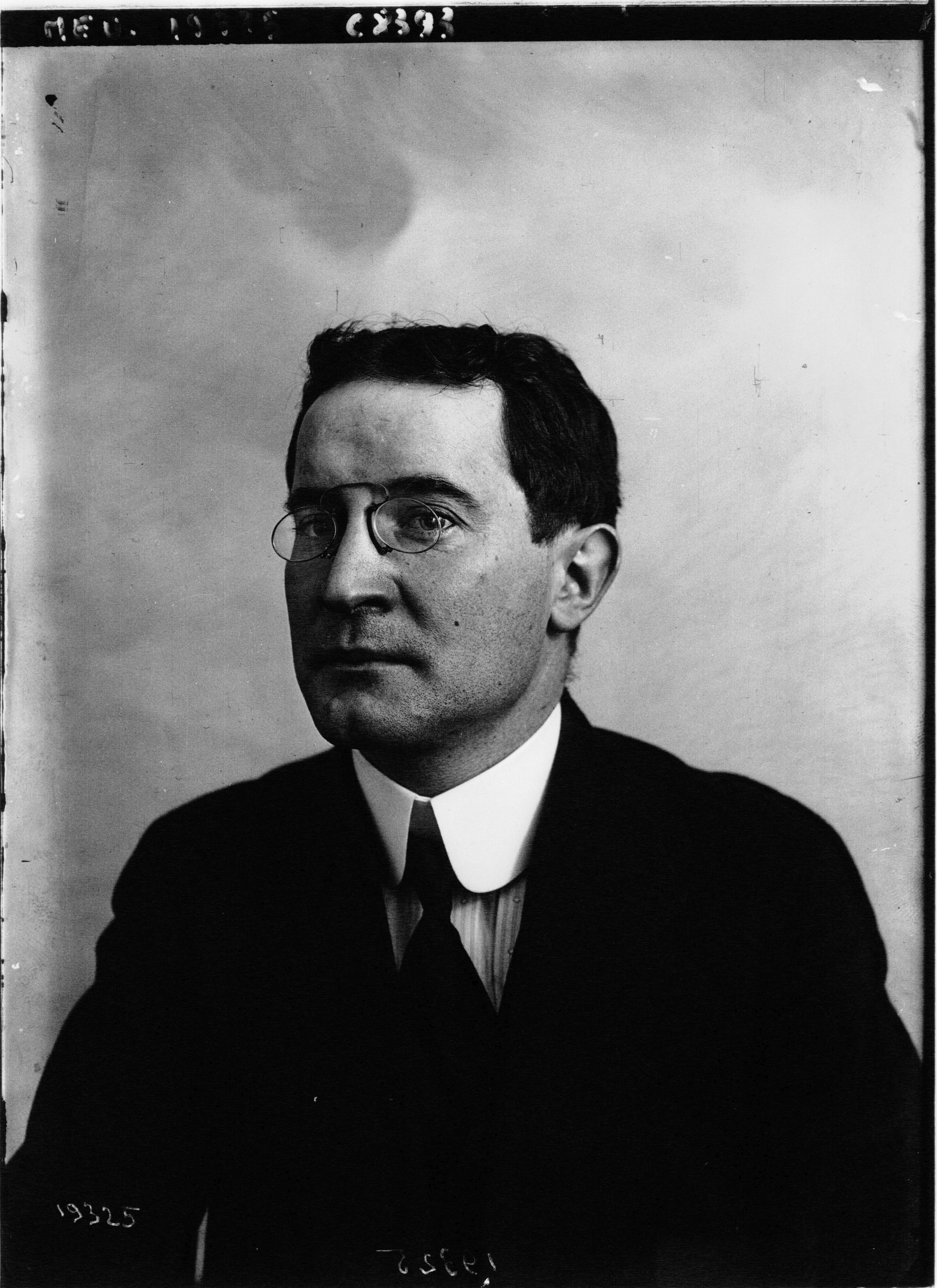
Géo Lefèvre in 1911

Géo Lefèvre (1877–1961) was a French sports journalist and the originator of the idea for the Tour de France.

He suggested the idea for the Tour at a meeting with Henri Desgrange, editor of the daily newspaper L'Auto as a way to boost circulation. Desgrange recruited Lefèvre from the rival daily sports paper, Le Vélo, to work as his rugby and cycling correspondent. Lefèvre played both sports but was keener on cycling. When L'Auto's circulation did not match the hopes of its backers, Lefèvre was the youngest at a crisis conference held on the first floor of L'Auto's office in the rue Faubourg Montmartre in Paris. He said in subsequent interviews that he suggested a six-day race round France only because he could think of nothing else to say.

Desgrange said: "As I understand it, petit Géo, you are suggesting a Tour de France". The name had been used before, particularly in car racing, as the Tour de France Automobile was first held in 1899, but it was the first time it had been used in cycling. Desgrange took Lefèvre for lunch and the pair discussed the idea over coffee. Only when the newspaper's accountant, Victor Goddet, said he would put the company's funds into the scheme did Desgrange accept the idea. He did not believe it so whole-heartedly, though, because he stayed away from the first Tour in 1903 and appointed Lefèvre director of the course and judge at both the start and finish, following the race by train, missing the finish in Lyon.

Géo Lefèvre also played a key role in the early days of the sport of cyclo-cross.
