= Émilien Amaury =

French publishing magnate (1909–1977)

- Emilien Amaury circa 1950
- Born: 5 March 1909; Étampes, France
- Died: 2 January 1977 (aged 67); Chantilly, France
- Resting place: St-Pierre Cemetery, Chantilly
- Other names: French Resistance code names Jupiter and Champin.
- Occupations: Bicycle delivery boy (1921), Barman, Army, Office Secretary (1928), Founder of the Office de Publicité Générale (1930), Technical adviser to the Minister of Overseas France, Head of Propaganda in Vichy France (1940), Publisher (1944), Press magnate.
- Known for: Croix de Guerre, French Resistance leader, Founder of Amaury Organisation
- Children: Philippe, Francine

Émilien Amaury (French pronunciation: [emiljɛ̃ amoʁi]; 5 March 1909 – 2 January 1977) was a French publishing magnate whose company now organises the Tour de France. He worked with Philippe Pétain, head of the French government in Vichy France during the Second World War, but used his position to find paper and other materials for the French Resistance. His links with Jacques Goddet, the organiser of the Tour de France, led to a publishing empire that included the daily sports paper, L'Équipe. Amaury died after falling from his horse; his will led to six years of legal debate.

== Background ==
Émilien Amaury was born in modest circumstances in the town of Étampes. He left both his school and his family at 12. (Other sources say he left at 10) He began work as a bicycle delivery boy, worked in a bar, then joined the army in compulsory military service. On leaving the army he became at 19 secretary to Marc Sangnier, a journalist and politician, (Note: Marc Sangnier founded a newspaper, La Démocratie, which campaigned for equality for women, proportional representation at elections, and for pacifism. He was also one of the pioneers of the French youth-hostelling movement.) going from there in 1930 to found the OPG, the Office de Publicité Générale, which handled advertising for several Christian-Democrat newspapers. In 1937 he became technical adviser to the Minister for the Colonies, Marius Moutet.

== War and Resistance ==
France declared war against Germany in 1939. Amaury was conscripted into the cavalry in 1938 and was awarded the Croix de Guerre, but he was captured when Germany invaded the Ardennes in 1940. He escaped soon afterwards and returned to Paris. The government collapsed with the invasion and a new state was declared, with its headquarters at Vichy. Its leader, Philippe Pétain, put Amaury in charge of propaganda for the well-being of the family. Amaury, however, had been in contact with an early Resistant, Henri Honoré d'Estienne d'Orves, and through him had helped start the Rue de Lille Group, a Parisian cell of the growing Resistance movement in which Amaury took the code names Jupiter and Champin. He used his government position to procure paper – which was rationed – for Resistance newspapers and to supply other material. The paper he procured made it possible to print 30,000 and sometimes 100,000 copies of news sheets such as Résistance, L'Humanité and Témoignage Chrétien.

The Rue de Lille Group – named after a street in Paris – also printed the text of General Charles de Gaulle's broadcast to France on the BBC of 18 June 1940, and printed forged documents for Resistance members. (Note: De Gaulle had been promoted to acting general after leading tanks against the German invasion. He was then called to join the government, led by the Prime Minister of France, Paul Reynaud. Reynaud's wish to resist the German Occupation led him to send De Gaulle to London to meet Winston Churchill. It was on the last of several visits to London that de Gaulle broadcast on the French service of the BBC. Few heard the broadcast and even fewer had heard of de Gaulle but his words, reminding France that it had lost a battle but that the war continued across the war and the French could be part of it, became a call to resistance. The speech was printed and circulated across France by Resistance movements and is today reproduced in many of the city's squares and on war memorials.)

== Origins of press empire ==
Newspapers and magazines which had continued to publish during the Occupation were closed down and their possessions sequestrated by the State at the end of the war. The way was open to new entrepreneurs and to those whose reputations had survived the war years.

Among the newspapers closed had been the sports daily, L'Auto, which had founded the Tour de France in 1903. The editor, Jacques Goddet, had refused to run the race when the Germans invited him to but his paper printed news favourable to the occupiers, many of its shares were held by Nazi sympathisers, and Goddet himself had been a supporter of Pétain. He was able to show that L'Auto's print works, through its head, Roger Roux, had clandestinely produced news sheets for the Resistance generally and for Amaury in particular. An inquiry absolved Goddet of collaboration and, through Amaury's interest, allowed Goddet to open another newspaper, L'Équipe, and to run the Tour de France. Both the paper and the race later became part of Amaury's business network.

Amaury's first publication, however, building on the wreckage of the collaborationist press, was a weekly, Carrefour ("crossroads"), in August 1944. His links with the Ligue Féminine d'Action Catholique led to the foundation of Marie-France, which he later edited. He also created the Syndicat de la Presse Hebdomadaire Parisienne ("Parisian weekly press union", later known as the Syndicat Professionnel de la Presse Magazine et d'Opinion), and was elected its president for 33 successive years.

Amaury founded a daily paper, Le Parisien Libéré on 22 August 1944, three days before liberation of the capital. The first headline was "The victory of Paris is in progress!"(La victoire de Paris est en marche!) The paper changed name to Le Parisien in 1986. The paper grew from the ashes of Le Petit Parisien, a paper founded in 1876 but which had been tainted by collaboration during the second world war. The government closed it, along with other newspapers, and licensed Le Parisien Libéré and L'Humanité to take over the paper's headquarters in the rue d'Enghien.

== Strike ==
Economic problems in the 1970s cost the popular press, including Le Parisien Libéré, much of its readership. (Note: The American magazine Time described Le Parisien-Libéré as a lowbrow daily.) On 1 March 1975, Le Parisien Libéré's management told workers' representatives of a plan to cut 300 jobs, including those of 200 printers, and to print fewer papers. On 4 March the company closed one of its print works, in the rue d'Enghien in Paris. The unions said they had been given no notice and it led to one of the longest strikes in French newspaper history and to the murder of an innocent man confused with the paper's editor.

Production of the paper was interrupted from 7 March. Amaury refused the claims of his workers. The printers stopped work, helped by colleagues elsewhere in the CGT trade union who gave a tenth of their salary to a strike fund. The printers took over two of the newspapers' plants and barricaded themselves behind rolls of newsprint. After two weeks Amaury had the paper printed in Belgium. Printers hijacked two loads of papers being driven south and threw them into the fields. The rest of the delivery made it to Paris and the newspaper maintained some of its circulation after moving printing to a plant north of Paris staffed partly by printers from Le Parisien Libéré who belonged to a different union.

Protesters occupied the liner, SS France and scaled the Notre Dame in central Paris to scatter pamphlets and protested at the Tour de France, run by another part of Amaury's organisation.

The episode became more violent when a bomb killed the editor-in-chief of Agence France Presse at his apartment in Paris. An anonymous caller told a local radio station: "We have just blasted the home of Cabanes of Le Parisien Libéré." Bernard Cabanes was unconnected with the dispute; police believed the bomb was intended for the newspaper's editor, another journalist of the same name. Printers denied involvement. The dispute lasted 29 months.

== Tour de France ==
The Tour de France cycle race began in 1903 to promote the newspaper, L'Auto. The paper was among those closed at Liberation, its property sequestrated by the state. Its editor, Jacques Goddet, had compiled a dossier to show how much his paper had contributed privately to the Resistance even if its public stance had favoured the Germans. Émilien Amaury was among his supporters. (Note: While Jacques Goddet could never be called a collaborator and insisted that he had done much to thwart the Germans, including refusing to organise the Tour despite the privileges they were offering (see Tour de France during the Second World War), his position was confused by the actions of his elder brother, Maurice. Like Jacques, Maurice had inherited their father's share in the publishing business. Maurice was eased out when his flamboyant policies came close to ruining the company and his final act was to sell shares to a consortium of Germans close to the Nazi party. The major holding in the paper was also sold to the Germans by Albert Lejeune, on behalf of his boss Raymond Petenôtre, who had taken refuge in the USA. L'Auto therefore fell to some extent under German control and the column of general news that Goddet had included to widen the appeal of L'Auto appeal became a propaganda tool for the occupants.) Goddet was forbidden to use the name L'Auto, judged to give an unfair advantage over rival sports papers. The new paper took the name L'Équipe instead. It applied successfully to organise the Tour de France.

L'Équipe's finances were never secure and in 1968 Amaury bought an interest but maintained Goddet as editor. Amaury's condition was that his own cycling reporter, Félix Lévitan, should share organisation of the Tour. Lévitan slowly took over from Goddet, especially in arrangements for sponsorship and finance. He and Goddet were business partners rather than friends, and Lévitan came into his own when Amaury bought L'Équipe and the Tour. Amaury's death meant ownership passed, after a legal battle, to his son, Philippe. Friction over inheritance (see below) meant Philippe was anxious to change some of the arrangements he had taken over and Lévitan fell out of favour. (Note: On 17 March 1987 Levitan found the locks of his office changed and a court official waiting to search and clear it amid claims, never proven, of financial mismanagement. Goddet became race director-at-large before leaving the following year.)

The Tour de France is still run by Amaury Sport Organisation, part of the general Amaury group, which also organises the Dakar car rally and the Paris marathon, now run by Jean-Étienne Amaury, Philippe's son.

== Honors and awards ==
- Commander of the Order of Legion of Honour
- Croix de guerre 1939-1945
- Resistance Medal
- Commander of the Ordre des Palmes Académiques

== Death ==
Amaury died after falling from his horse in the forest near Chantilly, Oise. The left-wing newspaper Libération reflected the manner in which many of its readers perceived him by the headline Amaury falls from his horse: the horse is safe. His death led to a six-year legal battle over inheritance. Amaury left the bulk of his estate to his daughter, Francine. French law demands that offspring inherit equally and Amaury's son, Philippe, insisted on his share. The legal case was handled by Jacques Trémollet de Villers and six years later it settled amicably, Philippe taking the dailies and his sister magazines such as Marie-France and Point de Vue. His wife died in 1974.

Émilien Amaury is buried in the Saint-Pierre cemetery at Chantilly.
