= Grande Roue de Paris =

Ferris wheel in Paris (1900–1920)

Coordinates: 48°51′08″N 2°17′57″E

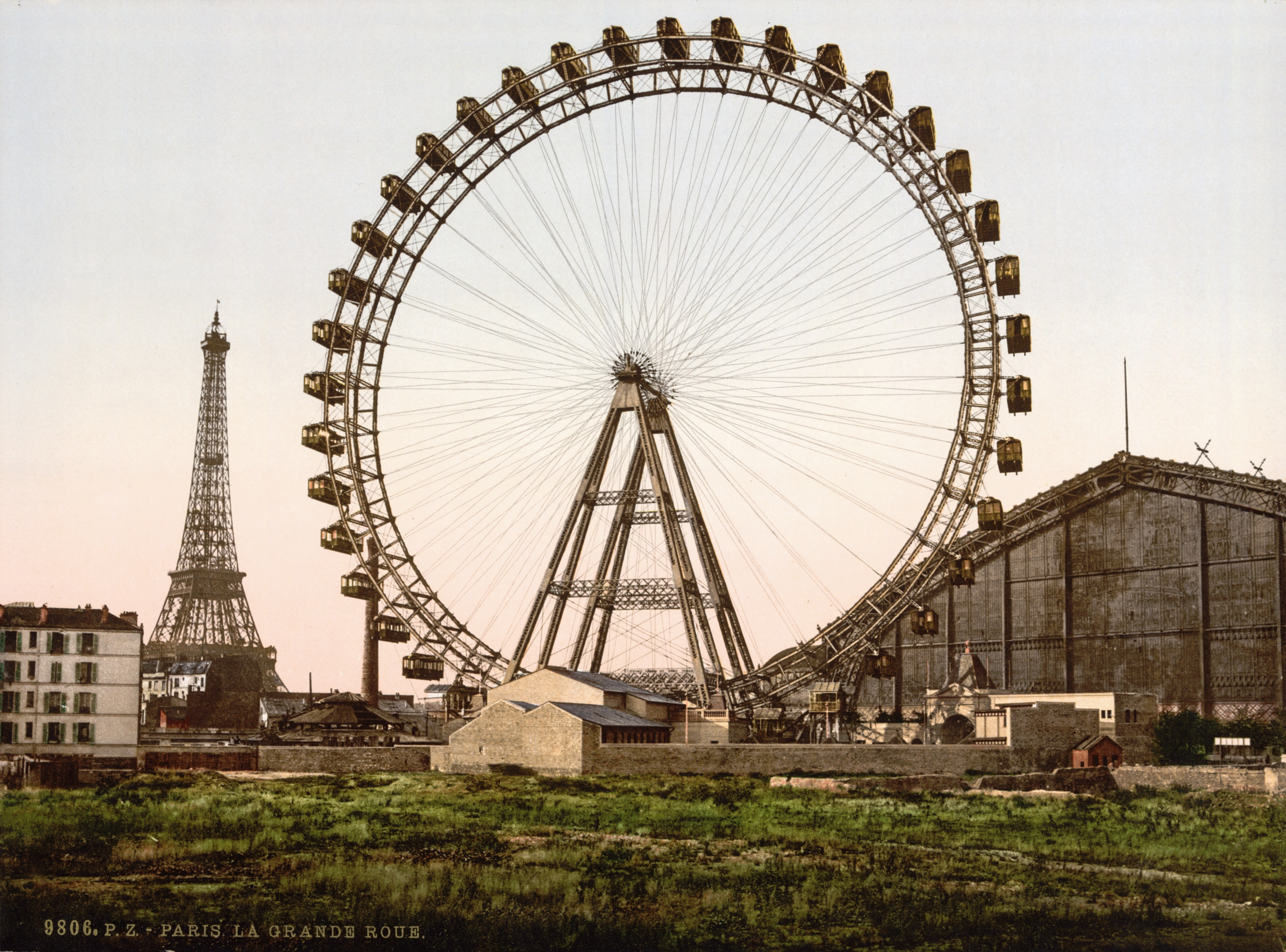
Grande Roue de Paris, c. 1900

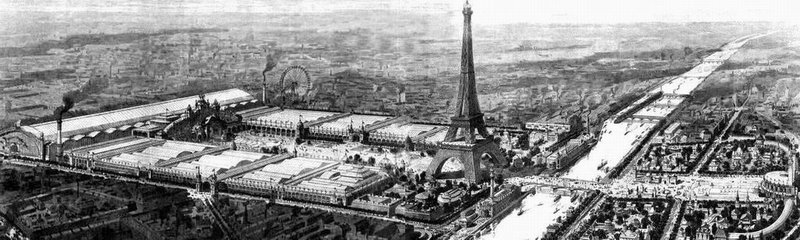
Exposition Universelle of 1900, viewed from north north east

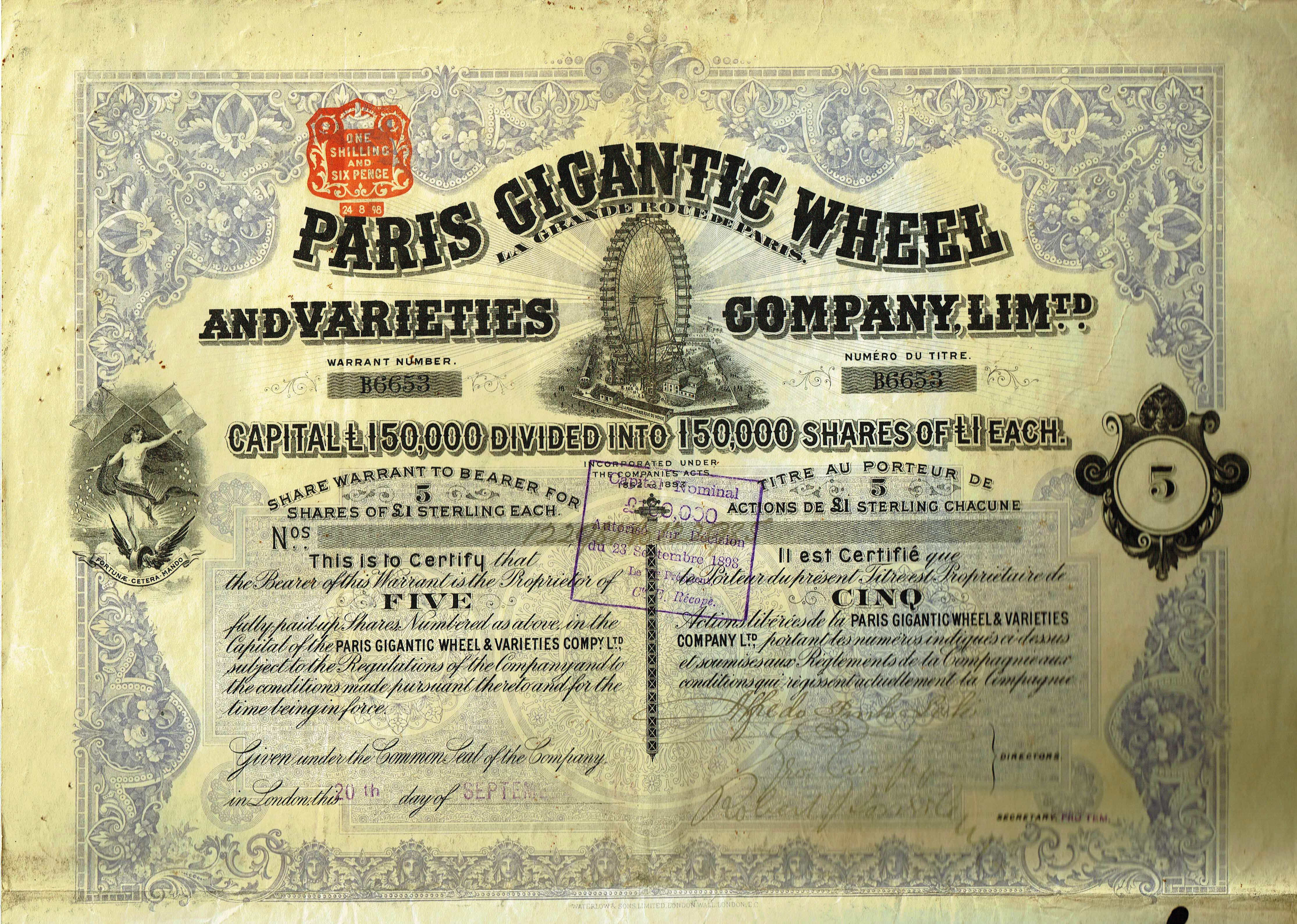
Share of the Paris Gigantic Wheel and Varieties Company, issued 20. September 1898

The Grande Roue de Paris was a 96-metre (315 ft) tall Ferris wheel built in 1900 for the Exposition Universelle world exhibition at Paris. Financing the "Grande Roue de Paris" happened by the creation of the "Paris Gigantic Wheel and Varieties Company" and selling the shares of this company.

It was the tallest wheel in the world at the time of its opening.

Théodore Vienne, the industrialist and founder of the Paris–Roubaix cycle race, was both owner and director of the Grande Roue de Paris.

It was disassembled between 1920 and 1922 and rag-and-bone merchants used the pods as huts to carry on their trade. This evolved, through second-hand shops, into the antique trade that is now to be found on the site and known as the Swiss Village.

The passenger cars were removed from the wheel and used as homes for French families when the region was devastated by World War I. Almost 90 years passed between its construction and a taller wheel, the 107.5-metre (353 ft) Cosmo Clock 21, being built in Japan.

Preceded by Great Wheel	World's all-time tallest Ferris wheel 1900-1989	Succeeded by Cosmo Clock 21
Preceded by Great Wheel	World's tallest extant Ferris wheel 1900-1920	Succeeded by Wiener Riesenrad
