= Luna Park, Paris =

Recreational centre

Coordinates: 48.8792°N 2.2831°E

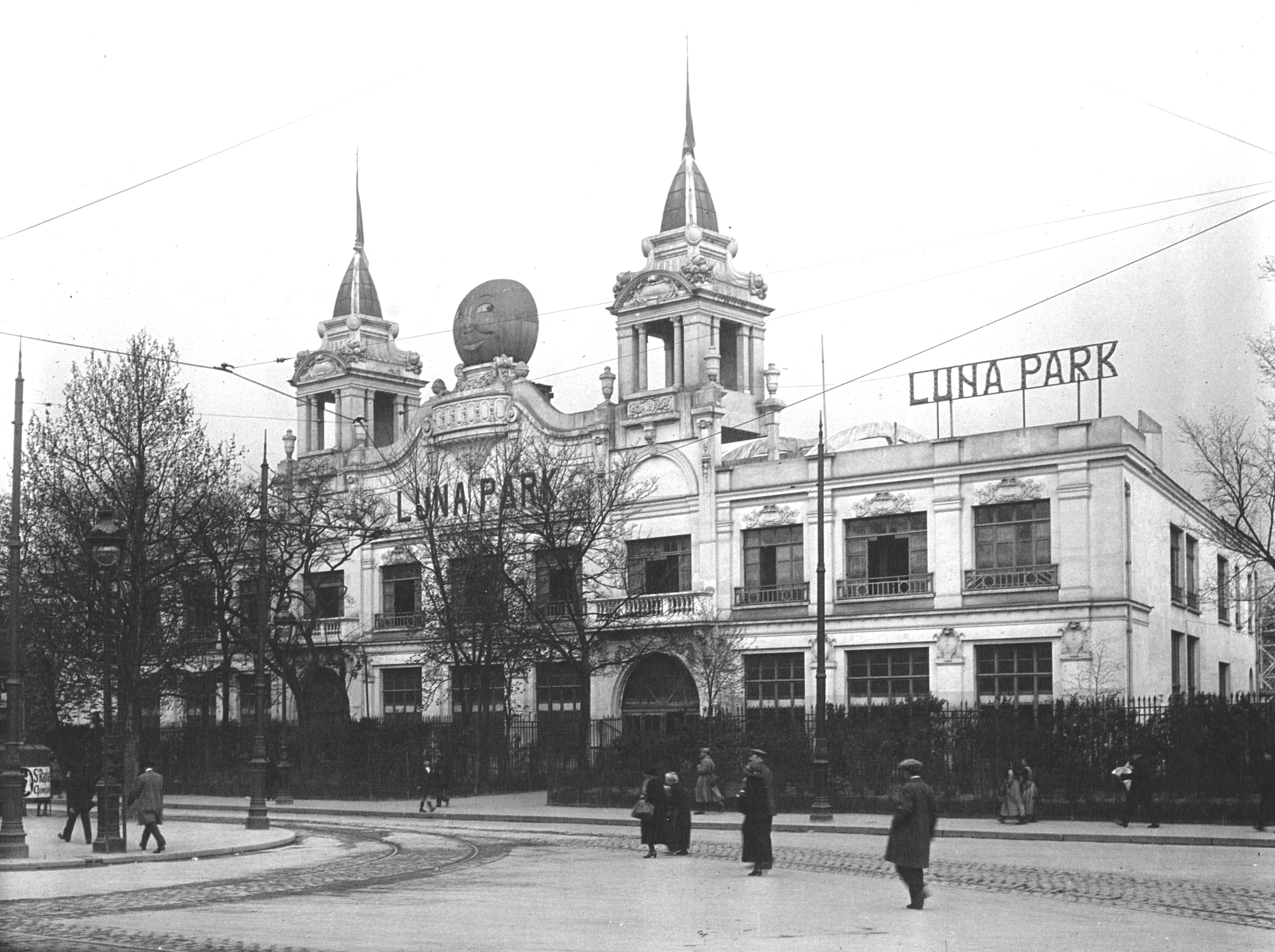
Luna Park in 1923

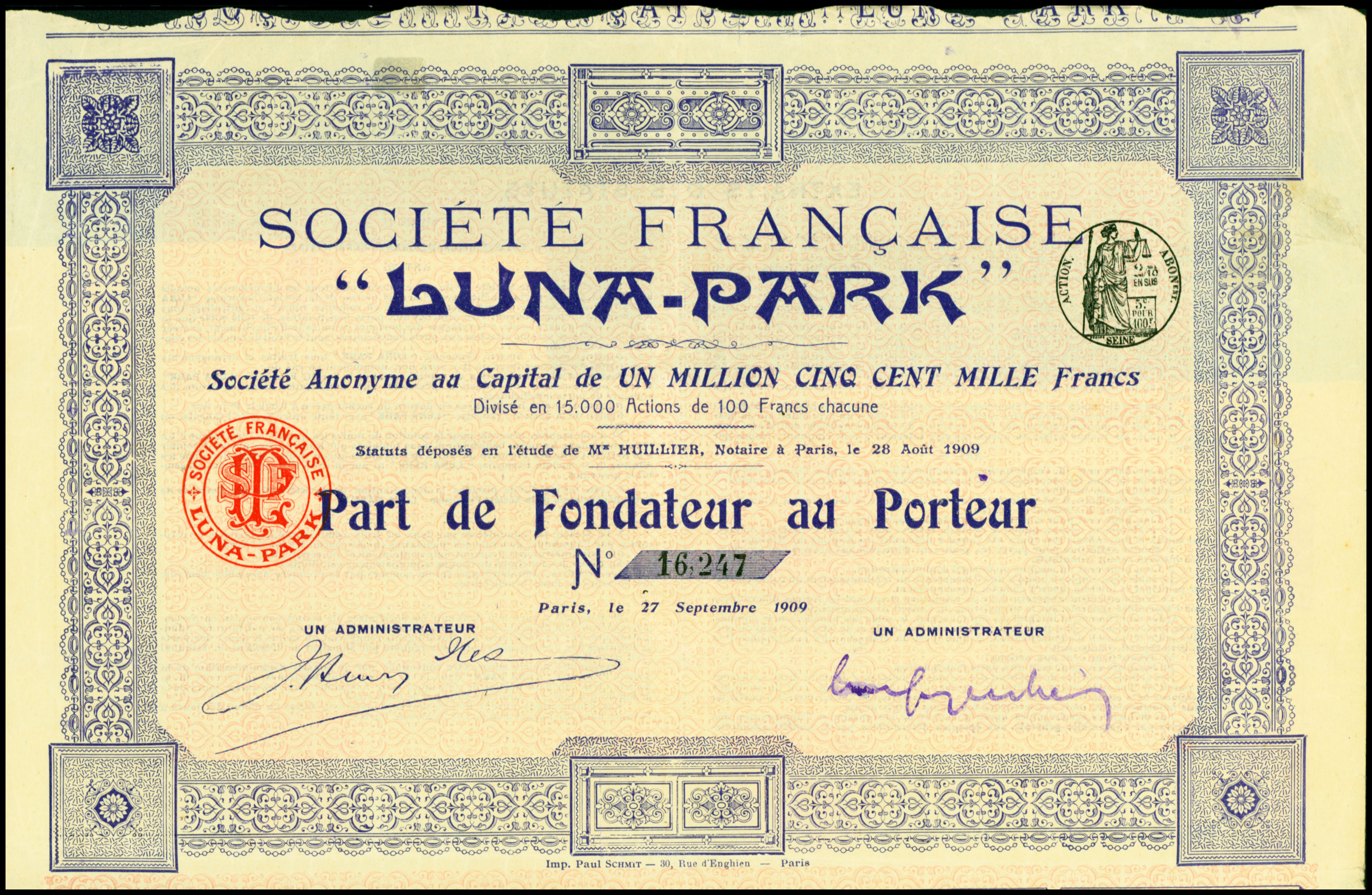
Share certificate of the Luna-Park, issued 27. September 1909

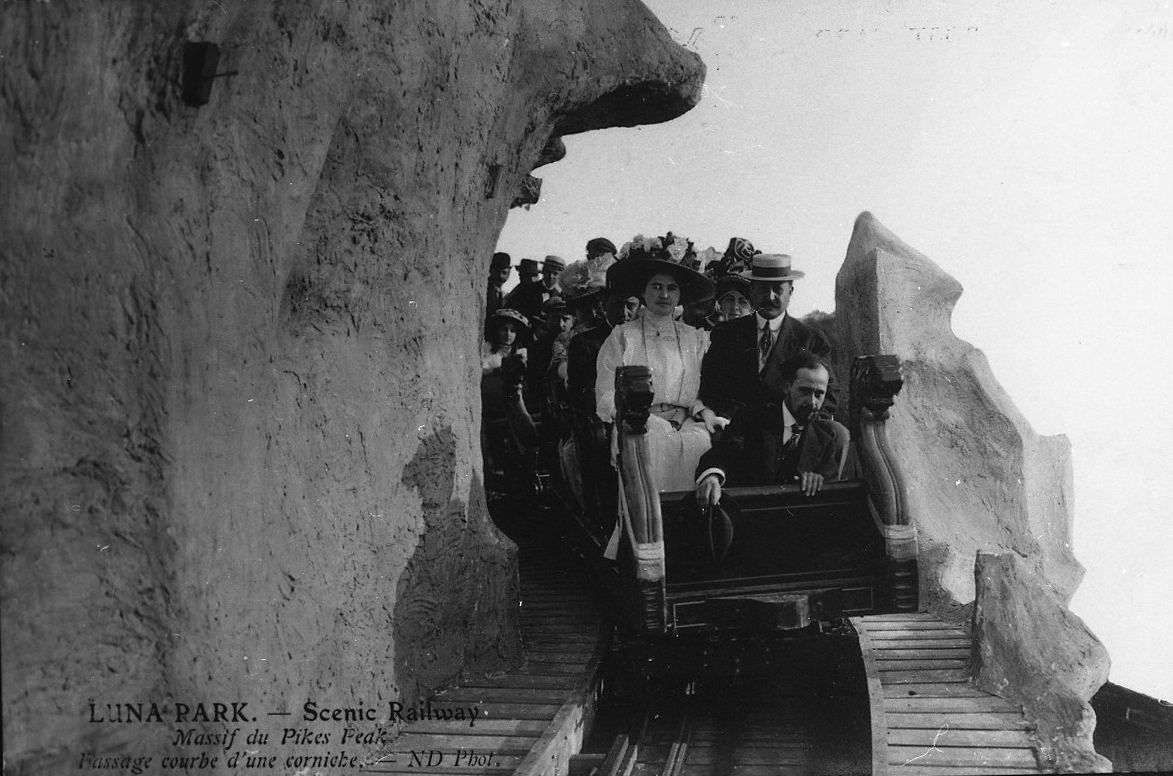
Scenic Railway

Luna Park was an amusement park near Porte Maillot in Paris, France from 1907 (or 1909) to 1931. Features of the park included a shoot-the-chutes ride, a scenic railway, "Le Chatouilleur" ("Diabolic wheels", a roller coaster-type ride in which people ride in a car that rocks as it is pulled up a mountain), a river ride through the mountain that was the base of the scenic railway, and a dance hall. An additional attraction was named the Brooklyn Bridge. Its operating hours were from 1:00 p.m. to midnight.

In 1907, Théodore Vienne, a wealthy industrialist and sports entrepreneur from Roubaix, founded the Wonderland Français with Robert Coquelle (Note: Robert Coquelle was a journalist and sports promoter. It was he who brought Major Taylor to race. He wrote for Le Velo and La Vie au Grand Air. He was born around 1870 and died around 1930) and Victor Breyer, a sports stadium at Luna Park. The New York Times reported in 1913:

Jack Johnson, heavyweight champion, was matched to-day to fight Frank Moran in this city during the second week of January, 1914, for the heavyweight championship of the world. Two clubs, the Nouveau Cirque and the Wonderland Francais, are now bidding for the match, and the decision will be made known Saturday.

The Nouveau Cirque, which holds its bouts at the Velodrome d'Hiver in Passy, will seat 30,000 people, and it has offered Johnson 50 percent of the gross receipts, with 25 percent for Moran. The Wonderland Club, which is under the control of Theodore Vienne, the leading fight promoter of France, will submit its bid tomorrow. It is said that both parties favor Vienne's club, as the fight would be held in Luna Park, Paris, thereby drawing a great society crowd.

Waning popularity, in part due to the worsening global economic conditions, prompted the park ownership to purchase 25 embalmed whales and 100 live penguins for exhibit in 1931. The additional displays did not help: Luna Park closed in the autumn of the same year.
