= Amaury Sport Organisation =

Sport promoting company

- Amaury Sport Organisation logo
- Abbreviation: ASO and A.S.O.
- Formation: 1992; 34 years ago
- Founder: Philippe Amaury
- Legal status: Private company
- Purpose: Sport event management
- Headquarters: 40 Quai du Point du Jour, Issy-les-Moulineaux, 92100
- Location: Boulogne-Billancourt, France
- Services: Sporting events including: Tour de France; Tour de France Femmes; Tour Auvergne-Rhône-Alpes; Liège–Bastogne–Liège; Paris–Roubaix; Volta a Catalunya; Dakar Rally; World Rally-Raid Championship; Lacoste Ladies Open de France; Tour Voile; Paris Marathon
- President: Jean-Etienne Amaury
- Parent organization: Éditions Philippe Amaury

The Amaury Sport Organisation (ASO and also A.S.O.) is a private company, founded in 1992, that is part of the privately owned French media group Éditions Philippe Amaury (EPA). ASO organises the Tour de France and other cycling races, as well as golf, running, sailing and off-road motorsport events over 250 days of competition per year, with 90 events in 30 countries. The president of ASO is Jean-Etienne Amaury, the son of Philippe Amaury and Marie-Odile Amaury, and grandson of EPA founder, Émilien Amaury.

== Cycling ==
The Tour de France was instituted by the newspaper L'Auto in 1903. The paper was closed after World War II because of its links with the occupying Germans and a new paper, L'Équipe, took over. L'Équipe organised the Tour and in 1965 the newspaper was acquired by Émilien Amaury. L'Équipe organised the race until it was taken over by its parent company, ASO. As of 2022, ASO claimed to be the world leader in bicycle race organisation with 132 days of competition each year.

=== Current ===
As of 2022 ASO organises the following cycling events:

UCI World Tour

- Tour Auvergne-Rhône-Alpes
- Eschborn–Frankfurt
- La Flèche Wallonne
- Liège–Bastogne–Liège
- Paris–Nice
- Paris–Roubaix
- Tour de France
- Volta a Catalunya
- Vuelta a España (alongside Unipublic)

UCI ProSeries

- Arctic Race of Norway
- Paris–Tours
- Deutschland Tour
- Tour of Oman
- Muscat Classic
- AlUla Tour

Women's

- Tour de France Femmes
- La Vuelta Femenina
- La Flèche Wallonne Féminine
- Liège–Bastogne–Liège Femmes
- Paris–Roubaix Femmes

Amateur & other

- Tour de l'Avenir
- Shanghai Criterium
- Saitama Critérium

=== Former ===
- Critérium International
- Tour of Beijing
- Tour of California
- Tour de Yorkshire / Women's Tour de Yorkshire
- La Course by Le Tour de France
- Tour de Picardie
- Tour of Qatar / Ladies Tour of Qatar
- World Ports Classic

== Golf ==
- Lacoste Ladies Open de France
- Le Vaudreuil Golf Challenge

== Motorsports ==
- Andalucía Rally
- Dakar Rally
- World Rally-Raid Championship

== Sailing ==
- Tour Voile
- Nice Ultimed

== Other ==
- Paris Marathon
