= Philippe Amaury =

French entrepreneur (1940–2006)

Philippe Amaury (French pronunciation: [filip amoʁi]; 6 March 1940 – 23 May 2006) was a French media tycoon, and the son of publisher Émilien Amaury.

Éditions Philippe Amaury (EPA), the company he founded, publishes Le Parisien, a local newspaper in Paris, as well as the national journal Aujourd'hui. In partnership with SNC L'Equipe, the group publishes the sports journals L'Équipe, L'Équipe Magazine, France Football and Vélo Magazine. EPA owns the television channel L'Equipe TV.

Amaury Sport Organisation is one of the biggest sports promoters in France, organising events such as the Tour de France, the Dakar Rally and the Paris Marathon.

He died of cancer in 2006 at the age of 66.
