= L'Équipe =

French sports newspaper

- Michael Olise and Zinedine Zidane on the front page of L'Équipe on 22 September 2026
- Type: Daily newspaper
- Format: Tabloid
- Owner: Groupe Amaury
- Editor-in-chief: Fabrice Jouhaud
- Editor: François Morinière
- Founded: 1946
- Language: French
- Headquarters: Boulogne-Billancourt
- ISSN: 0153-1069
- Website: lequipe.fr

L'Équipe (French: [lekip]; lit. 'The Team') is a French nationwide daily newspaper devoted to sport, owned by Éditions Philippe Amaury. The paper is noted for coverage of association football, rugby, motorsport, and cycling. Its predecessor, L'Auto, was founded by wealthy conservative industrialists to undermine Le Vélo, which they found too progressive. It was a general sports paper that also covered the auto racing which was gaining popularity at the turn of the twentieth century.

L'Auto launched the Tour de France road cycling stage race in 1903 as a circulation booster. The race leader's yellow jersey (French: maillot jaune) was instituted in 1919, reflecting the distinctive yellow newsprint on which L'Auto was published.

The European Champion Clubs' Cup, the competition that would later be rebranded as the UEFA Champions League, was also the brainchild of a L'Équipe journalist, Gabriel Hanot. The participating clubs in the first season were selected by L'Équipe on the basis that they were representative and prestigious clubs in Europe.

== History ==
=== L'Auto-Vélo ===
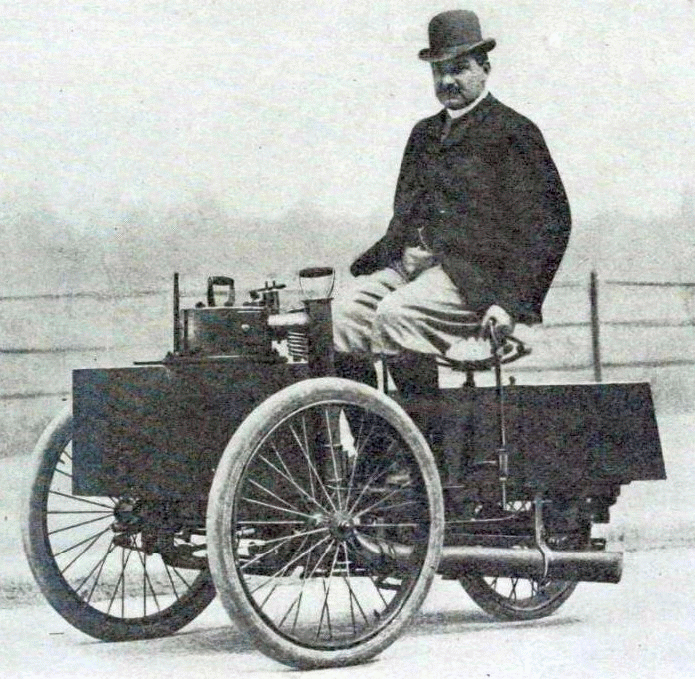
de Dion on one of his company's early products

L'Auto traces its origins to opposition to Le Vélo, a sports newspaper which began publishing in 1892. In addition to covering many athletic events including cycling, the paper also organized cycling races. Le Vélo took a Dreyfusard position on the Dreyfus affair which boosted the paper's sales.

As the national scandal developed, French society and media became increasingly polarized and acrimonious. Divisions within Le Vélo on whether Dreyfus was guilty lead to its eventual dissolution. Le Vélo began to adopt a pro-Dreyfus stance and allied with Dreyfusards. Its editor, Pierre Giffard, believed Dreyfus innocent and said so, leading to acrid disagreement with anti-Dreyfus conservative business owners, who were the main advertisers in the newspaper. These included the automobile-maker Comte de Dion and industrialists Adolphe Clément and Édouard Michelin.

Frustrated at Giffard's politics, they planned a rival paper, L'Auto-Vélo which began publishing in 1900. The editor was a prominent racing cyclist, Henri Desgrange, who had published a book of cycling tactics and training and was working as a publicity writer for Clément. Desgrange was a strong character but lacked confidence, so much doubting the Tour de France founded in his name that he stayed away from the pioneering race in 1903 until it looked like being a success.

=== L'Auto ===
Three years after the foundation of L'Auto-Vélo in 1900, a court in Paris decided that the title was too close to its main competitor, Giffard's Le Vélo. Thus reference to 'Vélo' was dropped and the new paper became simply L'Auto. It was printed on yellow paper because Giffard used green tint.

Circulation was sluggish, however, and only a crisis meeting called "to nail Giffard's beak shut", as Desgrange phrased it, came to its rescue. Then, on the first floor of the paper's offices in the rue du Faubourg-Montmartre in Paris, a 26-year-old cycling and rugby writer called Géo Lefèvre suggested a race round France, bigger than any other paper could rival and akin to six-day races on the track.

The Tour de France proved a success for the newspaper; circulation leapt from 25,000 before the 1903 Tour to 65,000 after it; in 1908 the race boosted circulation past a quarter of a million, and during the 1923 Tour it was selling 500,000 copies a day. The record circulation claimed by Desgrange was 854,000, achieved during the 1933 Tour.

Desgrange died in 1940 and ownership passed to a consortium of Germans. The paper began printing comments favourable to the occupying Nazis. When the Germans were finally defeated in 1945, the provisional French government forcibly dissolved the paper alongside other publications that printed pro-Nazi propaganda during the occupation.

=== L'Équipe ===
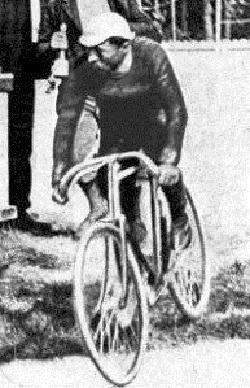
Maurice Garin (1871–1957), winner of the first Tour de France

In 1940 Jacques Goddet (1905–2000) succeeded Desgrange as editor and nominal organiser of the Tour de France (although he refused German requests to run it during the war, see Tour de France during the Second World War). Jacques Goddet was the son of L'Auto's first financial director, Victor Goddet. Goddet defended his paper's role in a court case brought by the French government but was never wholly cleared in the public mind of being close to the Germans or to the Head of the French State, Philippe Pétain (1856–1951).

Goddet could point, however, to clandestine printing of Resistance newspapers and pamphlets in the L'Auto print room and so was allowed to publish a successor paper called L'Équipe. It occupied premises across the road from where L'Auto had been, in a building that had actually been owned by L'Auto, although the original paper's assets had been sequestrated by the state. One condition of publication imposed by the state was that L'Équipe was to use white paper rather than yellow, which was too closely attached to L'Auto.

The new paper published three times a week from 28 February 1946. Since 1948 it has been published daily. The paper benefited from the demise of its competitors, L'Élan, and Le Sport. Its coverage of car racing hints at the paper's ancestry by printing the words L'Auto at the head of the page in the gothic print used in the main title of the prewar paper.

L'Équipe is published in tabloid format.

=== Émilien Amaury ===
In 1968 L'Équipe was bought by Émilien Amaury (1909–1977), founder of the Amaury publishing empire. Among L'Équipe's most respected writers have been Pierre Chany (1922–1996), Antoine Blondin (1922–1991) and Gabriel Hanot (1899–1968).

=== Philippe Amaury – Éditions Philippe Amaury ===
The death of Émilien Amaury in 1977 led to a six-year legal battle over inheritance between his son and daughter. This was eventually settled amicably with Philippe Amaury owning the dailies while his sister owned magazines such as Marie-France and Point de Vue. Philippe then founded Éditions Philippe Amaury (EPA), which included L'Équipe, Le Parisien and Aujourd'hui. At Philippe's death in 2006, the group passed to his widow, Marie-Odile, and their children.

=== Evolutionary milestones ===
- In 1980 L'Équipe began publishing a magazine with its Saturday edition.
- On 31 August 1998, L'Équipe TV was formed.
- In 2005 a Sports et Style supplement was added to the Saturday edition.
- In 2006 L'Équipe Féminine was first published.
- In 2006 L'Équipe bought the monthly, Le Journal du Golf.
- In early 2007 L'Équipe supplemented its main website with L'équipe junior, dedicated to youth.

== Circulation in France ==
Year	1999	2000	2001	2002	2003	2004	2005	2006	2007	2008	2016	2017	2018	2019	2020
Circulation	386,189	386,601	455,598	321,153	339,627	369,428	365,654	365,411	327,168	298,949	237,790	239,482	253,791	237,240	219,032

The newspaper's biggest-selling issue is that of 13 July 1998, the day after the France national football team won the World Cup for the first time after beating Brazil 3–0 at the Stade de France. Containing the banner headline Pour L'Éternité (For Eternity), it sold 1,645,907 copies. The second best was published on 3 July 2000 after France won UEFA Euro 2000, when the paper sold 1,255,633 copies.

In 2020, the circulation of L'Equipe was 219,032 copies.

== Directors ==
- 1946–1984: Jacques Goddet
- 1984–1993: Jean-Pierre Courcol
- 1993–2002: Paul Roussel
- 2003–2008: Christophe Chenut
- 2008–present: François Morinière

== Editors ==
- 1946–1954: Marcel Oger
- 1954–1970: Gaston Meyer
- 1970–1980: Édouard Seidler
- 1980–1987: Robert Parienté
- 1987–1989: Henri Garcia
- 1989–1990: Noel Couëdel
- 1990–1992: Gérard Ernault
- 1993–2003: Jérôme Bureau
- 2003–: Claude Droussent and Michel Dalloni

== See also ==
- L'Équipe Champion of Champions
- France Football
