= Le Parisien =

French daily newspaper

- Front pages of Le Parisien (regional) and Aujourd'hui en France (national) on 12 September 2016. While both editions carry the same main story, several side headlines are different.
- Type: Daily newspaper
- Format: Tabloid
- Owner: LVMH
- Founded: August 22, 1944; 82 years ago
- Political alignment: Neutral
- Language: French
- Headquarters: 15th arrondissement of Paris
- Circulation: 180,854 (as of 2020)
- ISSN: 0767-3558
- Website: leparisien.fr

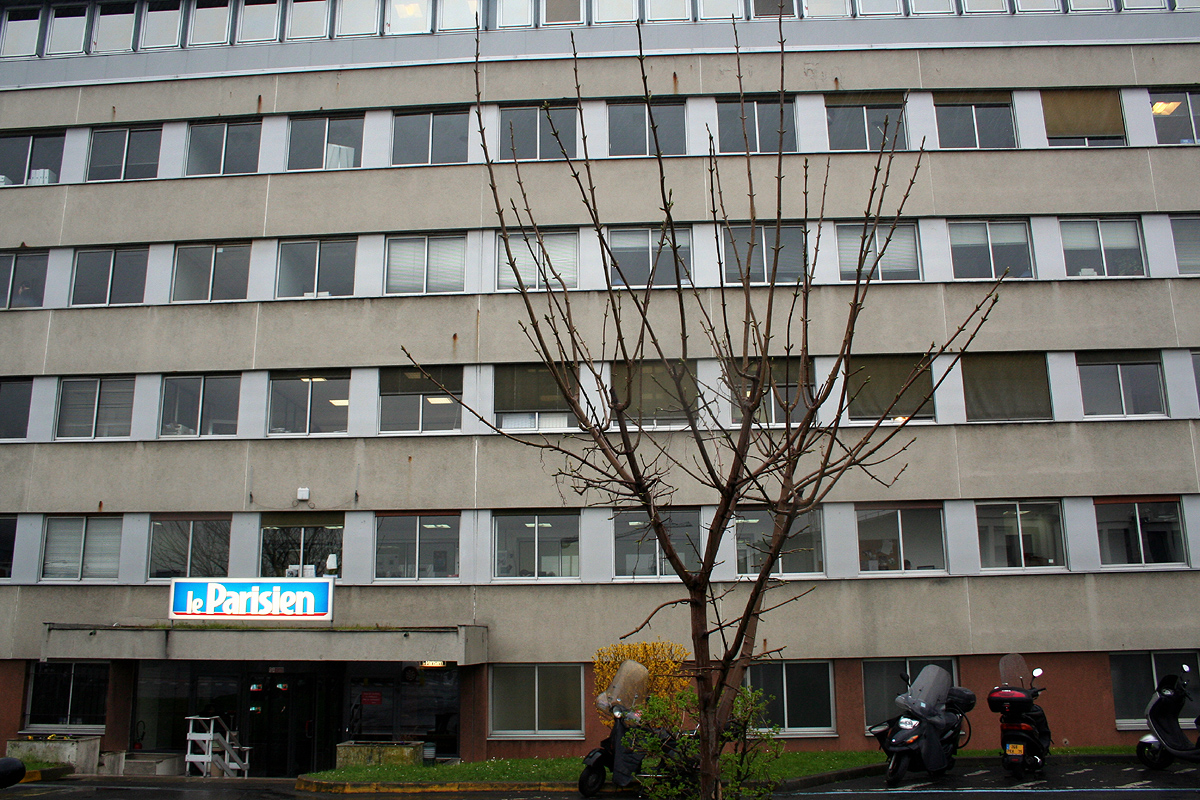
Head office of Le Parisien

Le Parisien (Note: French pronunciation: [lə paʁizjɛ̃]) (lit. 'The Parisian'), initially Le Parisien libéré until 1986, is a daily French newspaper founded in 1944 by Émilien Amaury, covering international and national news as well as local new from Paris and its surrounding regions. With nine departmental editions, Le Parisien is the most prominent regional newspaper across the Île-de-France and Oise areas. In 1994 it launched a national edition under the title Aujourd'hui en France. As of 2015, it is owned by billionaire Bernard Arnault's LVMH group under the subsidiary umbrella Les Echos-Le-Parisien Group.

Since the LVMH takeover, Le Parisien has run at a deficit on average of 20 million euros per year. As with other French newspapers, Le Parisien receives government subsidies through The Strategic Fund for the Development of the Press and the Aide à la Diffusion. In 2024, Le Parisien was given over 1.7 million euros in subsidies for nearly 60 million copies sold, equating to approximately 2.9 Euro cents per copy; additionally its national edition Aujourd’hui en France, received over 12 million euros in 2024 for a circulation of just under 22 million copies, or approximately 56.24 euro cents per copy sold.

== History and profile ==
Established as Le Parisien libéré (pronounced [lə paʁizjɛ̃ libeʁe]; lit. 'The Freed Parisian') by Émilien Amaury in 1944, the first edition was published on 22 August 1944. The paper was originally launched as the organ of the French underground during the German occupation of France in World War II.

Founded as a workers' cooperative by Amaury, with three Resistance comrades appointed as board members—Robert Buron, Jean Helleu, Félix Garras—and Claude Bellanger as general manager, the newspaper took the place of Le Petit Parisien, which had been banned for continuing to publish during the Occupation, and was tacitly assigned to the Organisation civile et militaire (OCM). In 1947, the newspaper became a public company and created a literary award, the Grand Prix Vérité, which rewards a work of eyewitness testimony or autobiography.

The motto of the newspaper's owner until 1977, devised by Émilien Amaury, was considered controversial because of its provocative statement: 'Information doesn’t have to be accurate, it has to be huge'.

The name was changed to the current one in 1986. A national edition exists, called Aujourd'hui en France (pronounced [oʒuʁdɥi ɑ̃ fʁɑ̃s]; lit. 'Today in France').

Le Parisien was acquired by LVMH the paper from Éditions Philippe Amaury in 2015.

== Circulation ==
Le Parisien had a circulation near to one million copies in the early 1970s. The paper reached a circulation of 659,200 copies on 24 April 1995, the day after the first round of the presidential election. In the period of 1995–1996 the paper had a circulation of 451,159 copies.

The combined circulation of Le Parisien was 485,000 copies in 2001. The paper had a circulation of 147,143 copies and a combined circulation of 360,505 copies in 2002. It was the second largest regional newspaper in France with a combined circulation of 530,000 copies in 2008, behind Ouest-France, which had a circulation of about 800,000 copies. The circulation of Le Parisien was 229,638 copies in 2014. The circulation of Le Parisien was 264,952 copies in 2020.

Since the LVMH takeover, Le Parisien has run at a deficit on average of 20 million euros per year. As with other French newspapers, Le Parisien receives government subsidies through The Strategic Fund for the Development of the Press and the Aide à la Diffusion. In 2024, Le Parisien was given over 1.7 million euros in subsidies for nearly 60 million copies sold, equating to approximately 2.9 Euro cents per copy; additionally its national edition Aujourd’hui en France, received over 12 million euros in 2024 for a circulation of just under 22 million copies, or approximately 56.24 euro cents per copy sold.

Year	Circulation
2016	208,978
2017	207,386
2018	196,226
2019	187,041
2020	180,854
2021	182,291
2022	185,558
2023	188,118
DDM 01/2024	200,130
