= List of cyclists in the 1908 Tour de France =

Before the start of the 1908 Tour de France, 162 cyclists had subscribed for the race, and received starting numbers. 48 cyclists did not start, so the first stage started with 114 cyclists.

Because the cyclists were not allowed to change bicycles, the separation in two different classes in the years before had disappeared, and all cyclists started in the same category. The favourite for the victory was Lucien Mazan "Petit-Breton", the winner of the previous edition. He was supported by his Peugeot-team, which included the best cyclists; in the five previous editions of the Tour de France, they had won 20 stages. In addition, Petit-Breton was a skilled bicycle mechanic, which was important because the rules said that cyclists had to repair their bicycle without help. The strongest opposition was expected from the Alcyon team, led by Georges Passerieu and Gustave Garrigou.

French athlete Marie Marvingt had tried to participate in the 1908 Tour de France, but was refused permission because the race was only open to men. She rode the route after the race, and managed to finish it.

== By starting number ==
Legend
| No. | Starting number worn by the rider during the Tour |
| Pos. | Position in the general classification |
| DNF | Denotes a rider who did not finish |

| No. | Name | Nationality | Pos. | Ref |
|---|---|---|---|---|
| 1 | Édouard Wattelier | France | 28 | |
| 2 | Lucien Mazan | France | 1 | |
| 3 | Gustave Garrigou | France | 4 | |
| 4 | Émile Georget | France | DNF | |
| 5 | Georges Passerieu | France | 3 | |
| 6 | Maurice Brocco | France | DNF | |
| 7 | Henri Cornet | France | 8 | |
| 8 | Jean-Baptiste Dortignacq | France | DNF | |
| 9 | Georges Paulmier | France | 6 | |
| 10 | Omer Beaugendre | France | 13 | |
| 11 | Christophe Laurent | France | DNF | |
| 12 | Hippolyte Aucouturier | France | DNF | |
| 13 | Georges Fleury | France | 7 | |
| 16 | Pierre Privat | France | DNF | |
| 17 | Marcel Berthet | France | DNF | |
| 19 | Constant Ménager | France | DNF | |
| 20 | Jean Novo | France | DNF | |
| 21 | René Fleury | France | DNF | |
| 23 | Hubert Baert | France | DNF | |
| 24 | Alzir Vivier | France | DNF | |
| 25 | Armand Roume | France | DNF | |
| 26 | Léon Winant | France | DNF | |
| 27 | Marcel Robert | France | DNF | |
| 28 | Marcel Dozol | France | DNF | |
| 29 | Albert Chartier | France | DNF | |
| 30 | Pierre Desvages | France | DNF | |
| 31 | Prosper Rau | France | DNF | |
| 32 | Armand Perin | France | DNF | |
| 33 | Louis Trousselier | France | DNF | |
| 34 | Cyrille van Hauwaert | Belgium | DNF | |
| 35 | Augustin Ringeval | France | DNF | |
| 36 | Henri Lignon | France | DNF | |
| 37 | André Pottier | France | 17 | |
| 38 | François Lafourcade | France | DNF | |
| 39 | Marcel Godivier | France | 9 | |
| 40 | Paul Duboc | France | 11 | |
| 41 | Antoine Lombret | France | DNF | |
| 42 | Martin Soulie | France | 23 | |
| 44 | Eugène Platteau | Belgium | DNF | |
| 45 | Aloïs Catteau | Belgium | 21 | |
| 47 | Jules Masselis | Belgium | DNF | |
| 49 | Paul Boillat | Switzerland | DNF | |
| 50 | Eugène Forestier | France | 15 | |
| 52 | Noël Combelles | France | 25 | |
| 54 | Marceau Narcy | France | 22 | |
| 56 | Georges Bamonde | France | DNF | |
| 59 | Alexandre Bodinier | France | 27 | |
| 61 | Jules Chabas | France | DNF | |
| 63 | Fernand Huillier | France | DNF | |
| 64 | Ferdinand Payan | France | 24 | |
| 65 | Marcel Lequatre | Switzerland | DNF | |
| 66 | Moïse Fugere | France | DNF | |
| 67 | Albert Lagarnier | France | DNF | |
| 68 | Léon Rabot | France | 33 | |
| 69 | Paul Dunan | France | DNF | |
| 70 | René Salais | France | DNF | |
| 72 | Robert Lecointe | France | 30 | |
| 74 | Giuseppe Bonfanti | Italy | DNF | |
| 77 | Achille Germain | France | 16 | |
| 78 | Pierre Poinet | France | DNF | |
| 81 | Philippe Pautrat | France | DNF | |
| 82 | F. Gonzales | France | 26 | |
| 85 | Giovanni Gerbi | Italy | 20 | |
| 86 | François Faber | Luxembourg | 2 | |
| 87 | Georges Lorgeou | France | DNF | |
| 88 | Paul Chauvet | France | 14 | |
| 90 | Louis Gardent | France | DNF | |
| 92 | Georges Woiron | France | DNF | |
| 93 | Ernest Woiron | France | DNF | |
| 94 | Louis Bertanza | France | DNF | |
| 95 | Aldo Bettini | Italy | 19 | |
| 96 | Albert Dupont | Belgium | DNF | |
| 99 | Ernest Paul | France | 18 | |
| 100 | Raymond Lacot | France | DNF | |
| 101 | Carlo Galetti | Italy | DNF | |
| 103 | Louis Di Maria | France | 35 | |
| 104 | Maurice Pardon | France | DNF | |
| 105 | Georges Bronchard | France | 29 | |
| 106 | Léon Georget | France | DNF | |
| 107 | Julien Maitron | France | DNF | |
| 108 | André Carre | France | DNF | |
| 110 | André Sevestre | France | DNF | |
| 111 | Charles Cruchon | France | DNF | |
| 113 | Léon Girault | France | DNF | |
| 114 | Ernest Goujon | France | DNF | |
| 115 | Alexandre Gilles | France | DNF | |
| 116 | Firmin Court | France | DNF | |
| 117 | François Aucouturier | France | DNF | |
| 118 | Jean Darche | France | 34 | |
| 120 | Gaston Dagorneau | France | DNF | |
| 124 | Edmond Masson | France | DNF | |
| 125 | Luigi Chiodi | Italy | DNF | |
| 126 | Ernest Haillote | France | DNF | |
| 130 | Jules Deloffre | France | DNF | |
| 134 | Alfred Quenon | France | DNF | |
| 135 | Luigi Ganna | Italy | 5 | |
| 136 | Eberardo Pavesi | Italy | DNF | |
| 137 | Ange Varalde | France | DNF | |
| 138 | Henri Severin | France | DNF | |
| 139 | Hubert Serriere | France | DNF | |
| 140 | Eloi Guichard | France | 32 | |
| 142 | Henri Anthoine | France | 36 | |
| 143 | Jean Perreard | France | DNF | |
| 144 | Maurice Pellerin | France | DNF | |
| 146 | Giovanni Rossignoli | Italy | 10 | |
| 147 | Angelo Ben | France | DNF | |
| 148 | Louis Bertrand | France | DNF | |
| 149 | Joseph Chanteperdrix | France | DNF | |
| 150 | Alphonse Charpiot | France | DNF | |
| 152 | Giovanni Cuniolo | Italy | DNF | |
| 156 | A. Landon | France | DNF | |
| 157 | Clemente Canepari | Italy | 12 | |
| 161 | Franz Dülberg | Germany | DNF | |
| 162 | Antoine Wattelier | France | 31 | |
