= 1908 Tour de France, Stage 1 to Stage 7 =

Cycling race stages

Route of the 1908 Tour de France

The 1908 Tour de France was the 5th edition of Tour de France, one of cycling's Grand Tours. The Tour began in Paris on 13 July and Stage 7 occurred on 25 July with a flat stage to Nîmes. The race finished in Paris on 9 August.

== Stage 1 ==
13 July 1908 — Paris to Roubaix, 272 km (169.0 mi)

Stage 1 result and general classification after stage 1

Rank	Rider	Time
1	Georges Passerieu (FRA)	8h 27' 00"
2	Lucien Mazan (FRA)	+ 5' 00"
3	Ernest Paul (LUX)	s.t.
4	Luigi Ganna (ITA)	s.t.
5	François Faber (LUX)	+ 9' 00"
6	Eugène Forestier (FRA)	+ 9' 01"
7	Henri Lignon (FRA)	+ 10' 00"
8	Eugène Platteau (BEL)	+ 11' 00"
9	Georges Lorgeou (FRA)	s.t.
10	Jean Novo (FRA)	+ 13' 00"

== Stage 2 ==
15 July 1908 — Roubaix to Metz, 398 km (247.3 mi)

Stage 2 result

Rank	Rider	Time
1	Lucien Mazan (FRA)	13h 12' 00"
2	Georges Passerieu (FRA)	s.t.
3	Luigi Ganna (ITA)	+ 1' 00"
4	Georges Paulmier (FRA)	+ 18' 00"
5	Gustave Garrigou (FRA)	+ 19' 00"
6	Eberardo Pavesi (ITA)	+ 30' 00"
7	Carlo Galetti (ITA)	s.t.
8	Georges Fleury (FRA)	s.t.
9	Charles Cruchon (FRA)	+ 32' 00"
10	Clemente Canepari (ITA)	+ 32' 30"

General classification after stage 2

Rank	Rider	Points
1	Georges Passerieu (FRA)	3
2	Lucien Mazan (FRA)	3
3	Luigi Ganna (ITA)	7
4		
5		
6		
7		
8		
9		
10		

== Stage 3 ==
17 July 1908 — Metz to Belfort, 259 km (161 mi)

Stage 3 result

Rank	Rider	Time
1	François Faber (LUX)	9h 13' 00"
2	Lucien Mazan (FRA)	s.t.
3	Gustave Garrigou (FRA)	s.t.
4	Henri Cornet (FRA)	+ 6' 00"
5	Georges Paulmier (FRA)	s.t.
6	Cyrille van Hauwaert (BEL)	s.t.
7	Paul Duboc (FRA)	s.t.
8	Jean-Baptiste Dortignacq (FRA)	+ 12' 00"
9	Giovanni Rossignoli (ITA)	s.t.
10	Clemente Canepari (ITA)	s.t.

General classification after stage 3

Rank	Rider	Points
1	Lucien Mazan (FRA)	5
2	Luigi Ganna (ITA)	20
3	Gustave Garrigou (FRA)	24
4		
5		
6		
7		
8		
9		
10		

== Stage 4 ==
19 July 1908 — Belfort to Lyon, 309 km (192 mi)

Stage 4 result

Rank	Rider	Time
1	François Faber (LUX)	9h 52' 03"
2	Gustave Garrigou (FRA)	s.t.
3	Lucien Mazan (FRA)	+ 1"
4	Henri Cornet (FRA)	+ 12"
5	Jean-Baptiste Dortignacq (FRA)	+ 12' 29"
6	Cyrille van Hauwaert (BEL)	+ 12' 32"
7	Luigi Ganna (ITA)	+ 12' 34"
8	Giovanni Rossignoli (ITA)	+ 12' 35"
9	Clemente Canepari (ITA)	+ 12' 36"
10	Georges Paulmier (FRA)	+ 17' 12"

General classification after stage 4

Rank	Rider	Points
1	Lucien Mazan (FRA)	8
2	Gustave Garrigou (FRA)	26
3	Luigi Ganna (ITA)	27
4		
5		
6		
7		
8		
9		
10		

== Stage 5 ==
21 July 1908 — Lyon to Grenoble, 311 km (193 mi)

Stage 5 result

Rank	Rider	Time
1	Georges Passerieu (FRA)	11h 08' 00"
2	François Faber (LUX)	+ 19' 00"
3	Lucien Mazan (FRA)	+ 20' 00"
4	Marcel Godivier (FRA)	+ 26' 00"
5	Luigi Ganna (ITA)	+ 27' 00"
6	Paul Duboc (BEL)	s.t.
7	Georges Paulmier (FRA)	+ 38' 00"
8	Omer Beaugendre (FRA)	+ 40' 00"
9	Luigi Chiodi (ITA)	s.t.
10	André Pottier (FRA)	+ 46' 00"

General classification after stage 5

Rank	Rider	Points
1	Lucien Mazan (FRA)	11
2	Luigi Ganna (ITA)	32
3	Gustave Garrigou (FRA)	45
4		
5		
6		
7		
8		
9		
10		

== Stage 6 ==
23 July 1908 — Grenoble to Nice, 345 km (214 mi)

Stage 6 result

Rank	Rider	Time
1	Jean-Baptiste Dortignacq (FRA)	12h 12' 00"
2	Georges Passerieu (FRA)	s.t.
3	Maurice Brocco (FRA)	s.t.
4	Lucien Mazan (FRA)	s.t.
5	Gustave Garrigou (FRA)	+ 15' 00"
6	Paul Chauvet (FRA)	s.t.
7	Giovanni Gerbi (ITA)	+ 19' 00"
8	François Faber (LUX)	+ 26' 00"
9	Georges Paulmier (FRA)	+ 36' 00"
10	Georges Fleury (FRA)	s.t.

General classification after stage 6

Rank	Rider	Points
1	Lucien Mazan (FRA)	15
2	Luigi Ganna (ITA)	46
3	Georges Passerieu (FRA)	47
4		
5		
6		
7		
8		
9		
10		

== Stage 7 ==
25 July 1908 — Nice to Nîmes, 354 km (220 mi)

Stage 7 result

Rank	Rider	Time
1	Lucien Mazan (FRA)	12h 05' 00"
2	Giovanni Gerbi (ITA)	s.t.
3	Luigi Ganna (ITA)	+ 10' 00"
4	Marcel Godivier (FRA)	s.t.
5	Clemente Canepari (ITA)	+ 16' 00"
6	Gustave Garrigou (FRA)	+ 38' 00"
7	Henri Cornet (FRA)	s.t.
8	Maurice Brocco (FRA)	s.t.
9	Aldo Bettini (ITA)	s.t.
10	Eugène Forestier (FRA)	+ 39' 00"

General classification after stage 7

Rank	Rider	Points
1	Lucien Mazan (FRA)	16
2	Luigi Ganna (ITA)	49
3	Gustave Garrigou (FRA)	56
4		
5		
6		
7		
8		
9		
10		
