= 1908 Tour de France, Stage 8 to Stage 14 =

Cycling race stages

Route of the 1908 Tour de France

The 1908 Tour de France was the 6th edition of Tour de France, one of cycling's Grand Tours. The Tour began in Paris on 13 July and Stage 8 occurred on 27 July with a flat stage from Nîmes. The race finished in Paris on 9 August.

== Stage 8 ==
27 July 1908 — Nîmes to Toulouse, 303 km (188.3 mi)

Stage 8 result

Rank	Rider	Time
1	François Faber (LUX)	11h 08' 00"
2	Lucien Mazan (FRA)	s.t.
3	Georges Passerieu (FRA)	s.t.
4	Paul Duboc (FRA)	s.t.
5	Aldo Bettini (ITA)	s.t.
6	Marcel Godivier (FRA)	+ 1"
7	Henri Cornet (FRA)	s.t.
8	Georges Fleury (FRA)	s.t.
9	Gustave Garrigou (FRA)	+ 8' 00"
10	Omer Beaugendre (FRA)	s.t.

General classification after stage 8

Rank	Rider	Points
1	Lucien Mazan (FRA)	17
2	Georges Passerieu (FRA)	48
3	François Faber (LUX)	52
4		
5		
6		
7		
8		
9		
10		

== Stage 9 ==
29 July 1908 — Toulouse to Bayonne, 299 km (185.8 mi)

Stage 9 result

Rank	Rider	Time
1	Lucien Mazan (FRA)	10h 07' 00"
2	Giovanni Rossignoli (ITA)	s.t.
3	Gustave Garrigou (FRA)	s.t.
4	Henri Cornet (FRA)	s.t.
5	François Faber (LUX)	+ 4' 00"
6	Georges Passerieu (FRA)	+ 21' 00"
7	Georges Fleury (FRA)	s.t.
8	Georges Paulmier (FRA)	+ 1h 08' 00"
9	Luigi Ganna (ITA)	s.t.
10	Paul Chauvet (FRA)	+ 1h 11' 00"

General classification after stage 9

Rank	Rider	Points
1	Lucien Mazan (FRA)	18
2	François Faber (LUX)	57
3	Gustave Garrigou (FRA)	58
4		
5		
6		
7		
8		
9		
10		

== Stage 10 ==
31 July 1908 — Bayonne to Bordeaux, 269 km (167 mi)

Stage 10 result

Rank	Rider	Time
1	Georges Paulmier (FRA)	8h 25' 00"
2	Georges Passerieu (FRA)	s.t.
3	François Faber (LUX)	s.t.
4	Gustave Garrigou (FRA)	s.t.
5	Marcel Godivier (FRA)	s.t.
6	Georges Fleury (FRA)	+ 1"
7	Omer Beaugendre (FRA)	s.t.
8	Achille Germain (FRA)	s.t.
9	Paul Duboc (FRA)	s.t.
10	Lucien Mazan (FRA)	+ 1h 11' 00"

General classification after stage 10

Rank	Rider	Points
1	Lucien Mazan (FRA)	28
2	François Faber (LUX)	60
3	Georges Passerieu (FRA)	61
4		
5		
6		
7		
8		
9		
10		

== Stage 11 ==
2 August 1908 — Bordeaux to Nantes, 391 km (243 mi)

Stage 11 result

Rank	Rider	Time
1	Lucien Mazan (FRA)	14h 05' 00"
2	Georges Passerieu (FRA)	+ 12' 00"
3	François Faber (LUX)	s.t.
4	Georges Paulmier (FRA)	s.t.
5	Giovanni Gerbi (ITA)	s.t.
6	Clemente Canepari (ITA)	+ 39' 00"
7	Gustave Garrigou (FRA)	+ 47' 00"
8	Henri Cornet (FRA)	s.t.
9	Georges Fleury (FRA)	s.t.
10	Omer Beaugendre (FRA)	s.t.

General classification after stage 11

Rank	Rider	Points
1	Lucien Mazan (FRA)	29
2	François Faber (LUX)	63
3	Georges Passerieu (FRA)	63
4		
5		
6		
7		
8		
9		
10		

== Stage 12 ==
4 August 1908 — Nantes to Brest, 321 km (199 mi)

Stage 12 result

Rank	Rider	Time
1	François Faber (LUX)	11h 08' 00"
2	Gustave Garrigou (FRA)	s.t.
3	Lucien Mazan (FRA)	s.t.
4	Giovanni Rossignoli (ITA)	s.t.
5	Georges Fleury (FRA)	+ 1"
6	Georges Passerieu (FRA)	+ 36' 00"
7	Luigi Ganna (ITA)	s.t.
8	Henri Cornet (FRA)	+ 45' 00"
9	Ernest Paul (LUX)	s.t.
10	Paul Chauvet (FRA)	+ 49' 00"

General classification after stage 12

Rank	Rider	Points
1	Lucien Mazan (FRA)	32
2	François Faber (LUX)	64
3	Georges Passerieu (FRA)	69
4		
5		
6		
7		
8		
9		
10		

== Stage 13 ==
6 August 1908 — Brest to Caen, 415 km (258 mi)

Stage 13 result

Rank	Rider	Time
1	Georges Passerieu (FRA)	16h 23' 00"
2	François Faber (LUX)	s.t.
3	Lucien Mazan (FRA)	s.t.
4	Georges Fleury (FRA)	+ 8' 00"
5	Giovanni Rossignoli (ITA)	+ 15' 00"
6	Paul Duboc (FRA)	s.t.
7	Luigi Ganna (ITA)	+ 1h 04' 00"
8	Clemente Canepari (ITA)	s.t.
9	Marcel Godivier (FRA)	s.t.
10	Gustave Garrigou (FRA)	+ 1h 53' 00"

General classification after stage 13

Rank	Rider	Points
1	Lucien Mazan (FRA)	35
2	François Faber (LUX)	66
3	Georges Passerieu (FRA)	70
4		
5		
6		
7		
8		
9		
10		

== Stage 14 ==
9 August 1908 — Caen to Paris, 251 km (156 mi)

Stage 14 result

Rank	Rider	Time
1	Lucien Mazan (FRA)	8h 41' 18"
2	François Faber (LUX)	s.t.
3	Henri Cornet (FRA)	+ 58"
4	Omer Beaugendre (FRA)	s.t.
5	Georges Passerieu (FRA)	+ 11' 26"
6	Georges Paulmier (FRA)	+ 13' 30"
7	Paul Duboc (FRA)	s.t.
8	Eugène Forestier (FRA)	s.t.
9	Georges Fleury (FRA)	+ 19' 01"
10	Gustave Garrigou (FRA)	+ 19' 43"

General classification after stage 14

Rank	Rider	Points
1	Lucien Mazan (FRA)	36
2	François Faber (LUX)	68
3	Georges Passerieu (FRA)	75
4	Gustave Garrigou (FRA)	91
5	Luigi Ganna (ITA)	120
6	Georges Paulmier (FRA)	125
7	Georges Fleury (FRA)	134
8	Henri Cornet (FRA)	142
9	Marcel Godivier (FRA)	153
10	Giovanni Rossignoli (ITA)	160
