= Raymond Lacot =

French cyclist (1884–1915)

Personal information
- Full name: Eugène Raymond Lacot
- Born: 1 March 1884 Chassemy, France
- Died: 26 February 1915 (aged 30) Verdun, France

Cycling career
- Sport: Cycling
- Discipline: Road
- Role: Rider

Amateur teams
- 1903–1904: CA Sorbonne

Professional teams
- 1907: Individual
- 1908: Alcyon-Dunlop
- 1909: Panneton-Leman
- 1910–1911: Individual

Eugène Raymond Lacot (1 March 1884 – 26 February 1915) was a French professional road cyclist. Born in Chassemy, he competed professionally from 1907 to at least 1911. He achieved multiple podium finishes during his career and participated in two editions of the Tour de France.

== Biography ==
Originally from the Picardy region, Lacot began competing in cycling events in 1902. He turned professional in 1907 and remained active until at least 1911. A former member of the Alcyon-Dunlop team, he had multiple podium finishes at main cycling races. He finished in his early years third in Paris–Honfleur in 1903, second in 1908 Paris–Épernay and third the year after at Paris–Calais. He also competed in the 1908 Tour de France and the 1909 Tour de France. He also participated in other main international cycling races, including Paris-Bruxelles, Paris-Amiens, Paris-Calais, Paris-Lille and 1910 Paris–Tours.

During World War I, Lacot served in the French Army as a private. He died at the military hospital in Verdun in February 1915 after being wounded in combat by shell fragments.

== Major results ==
1903
3rd Paris–Honfleur
1907
2nd Paris–Épernay
1908
3rd Grand Prix Sabine
1909
3rd Paris–Calais
1911
3rd Paris–Amboise

=== Grand Tour and Classic results timeline ===
Race	1908	1909	1910
Tour de France	DNF (Stage 4)	DNF (Stage 4)	—
Paris–Brussels	13th	—	—
Paris–Tours	—	—	18th
