= 1909 Tour de France, Stage 1 to Stage 7 =

Cycling race stages

Route of the 1909 Tour de France

The 1909 Tour de France was the 7th edition of Tour de France, one of cycling's Grand Tours. The Tour began in Paris on 5 July and Stage 7 occurred on 17 July with a flat stage to Nîmes. The race finished in Paris on 1 August.

== Stage 1 ==
5 July 1909 — Paris to Roubaix, 272 km (169.0 mi)

Stage 1 result and general classification after stage 1

Rank	Rider	Team	Time
1	Cyrille van Hauwaert (BEL)	Alcyon-Dunlop	9h 18' 00"
2	François Faber (LUX)	Alcyon-Dunlop	s.t.
3	Octave Lapize (FRA)	Biguet-Dunlop	s.t.
4	André Blaise (BEL)	Lone rider	s.t.
5	Eugène Christophe (FRA)	Lone rider	s.t.
6	Ernest Paul (FRA)	Lone rider	s.t.
7	Gustave Garrigou (FRA)	Alcyon-Dunlop	+ 10' 00"
8	Louis Trousselier (FRA)	Alcyon-Dunlop	s.t.
9	Carlo Galetti (ITA)	Legnano	s.t.
10	Odile Defraye (BEL)	Biguet-Dunlop	s.t.

== Stage 2 ==
15 July 1909 — Roubaix to Metz, 398 km (247.3 mi)

Stage 2 result

Rank	Rider	Team	Time
1	François Faber (LUX)	Alcyon-Dunlop	13h 12' 00"
2	Octave Lapize (FRA)	Biguet-Dunlop	s.t.
3	Henri Cornet (FRA)	Nil-Supra	+ 1' 00"
4	Constant Ménager (FRA)	Le Globe	+ 18' 00"
5	Gustave Garrigou (FRA)	Alcyon-Dunlop	+ 19' 00"
6	Charles Cruchon (FRA)	Biguet-Dunlop	+ 30' 00"
7	Eugène Christophe (FRA)	Lone rider	s.t.
8	Paul Duboc (FRA)	Alcyon-Dunlop	s.t.
9	Cyrille van Hauwaert (BEL)	Alcyon-Dunlop	+ 32' 00"
10	Jean Alavoine (FRA)	Alcyon-Dunlop	+ 32' 30"

General classification after stage 2

	Rider	Team	Points
1	François Faber (LUX)	Alcyon-Dunlop	3
2	Octave Lapize (FRA)	Biguet-Dunlop	5
3	Cyrille van Hauwaert (BEL)	Alcyon-Dunlop	10
4			
5			
6			
7			
8			
9			
10			

== Stage 3 ==
9 July 1909 — Metz to Belfort, 259 km (161 mi)

Stage 3 result

Rank	Rider	Team	Time
1	François Faber (LUX)	Alcyon-Dunlop	9h 28' 00"
2	Gustave Garrigou (FRA)	Alcyon-Dunlop	+ 33' 00"
3	Eugène Christophe (FRA)	Lone rider	+ 1h 00' 00"
4	Ernest Paul (FRA)	Lone rider	s.t.
5	Constant Ménager (FRA)	Le Globe	s.t.
6	Cyrille van Hauwaert (BEL)	Alcyon-Dunlop	+ 1h 09' 00"
7	Paul Duboc (FRA)	Alcyon-Dunlop	+ 1h 26' 00"
8	Jean Alavoine (FRA)	Alcyon-Dunlop	+ 1h 28' 00"
9	Julien Maitron (FRA)	Le Globe	+ 1h 29' 00"
10	Julien Gabory (FRA)	Le Globe	s.t.

General classification after stage 3

	Rider	Team	Points
1	François Faber (LUX)	Alcyon-Dunlop	4
2	Gustave Garrigou (FRA)	Alcyon-Dunlop	14
3	Eugène Christophe (FRA)	Lone rider	15
4			
5			
6			
7			
8			
9			
10			

== Stage 4 ==
11 July 1909 — Belfort to Lyon, 309 km (192 mi)

Stage 4 result

Rank	Rider	Team	Time
1	François Faber (LUX)	Alcyon-Dunlop	10h 44' 00"
2	Constant Ménager (FRA)	Le Globe	+ 10' 00"
3	Gustave Garrigou (FRA)	Alcyon-Dunlop	+ 25' 00"
4	Jean Alavoine (FRA)	Alcyon-Dunlop	+ 28' 00"
5	Cyrille van Hauwaert (BEL)	Alcyon-Dunlop	+ 35' 00"
6	Paul Duboc (FRA)	Alcyon-Dunlop	s.t.
7	Ernest Paul (FRA)	Lone rider	+ 1h 08' 00"
8	Georges Fleury (FRA)	Le Globe	+ 1h 15' 00"
9	Eugène Christophe (FRA)	Lone rider	+ 1h 33' 00"
10	Julien Maitron (FRA)	Le Globe	+ 1h 44' 00"

General classification after stage 4

	Rider	Team	Points
1	François Faber (LUX)	Alcyon-Dunlop	5
2	Gustave Garrigou (FRA)	Alcyon-Dunlop	17
3	Cyrille van Hauwaert (BEL)	Alcyon-Dunlop	21
4			
5			
6			
7			
8			
9			
10			

== Stage 5 ==
13 July 1909 — Lyon to Grenoble, 311 km (193 mi)

Stage 5 result

Rank	Rider	Team	Time
1	François Faber (LUX)	Alcyon-Dunlop	11h 12' 00"
2	Gustave Garrigou (FRA)	Alcyon-Dunlop	+ 5' 00"
3	Cyrille van Hauwaert (BEL)	Alcyon-Dunlop	+ 12' 00"
4	Paul Duboc (FRA)	Alcyon-Dunlop	+ 17' 00"
5	Julien Maitron (FRA)	Le Globe	+ 17' 30"
6	Constant Ménager (FRA)	Le Globe	+ 19' 00"
7	Jean Alavoine (FRA)	Lone rider	+ 23' 00"
8	Ernest Paul (FRA)	Lone rider	+ 30' 00"
9	Aldo Bettini (ITA)	Lone rider	+ 35' 00"
10	Augustin Ringeval (FRA)	Le Globe	+ 48' 00"

General classification after stage 5

	Rider	Team	Points
1	François Faber (LUX)	Alcyon-Dunlop	6
2	Gustave Garrigou (FRA)	Alcyon-Dunlop	19
3	Cyrille van Hauwaert (BEL)	Alcyon-Dunlop	24
4			
5			
6			
7			
8			
9			
10			

== Stage 6 ==
15 July 1909 — Grenoble to Nice, 346 km (215 mi)

Stage 6 result

Rank	Rider	Team	Time
1	François Faber (LUX)	Alcyon-Dunlop	12h 09' 00"
2	Jean Alavoine (FRA)	Lone rider	+ 1' 00"
3	Paul Duboc (FRA)	Alcyon-Dunlop	+ 1' 01"
4	Constant Ménager (FRA)	Le Globe	s.t.
5	Gustave Garrigou (FRA)	Alcyon-Dunlop	+ 24' 00"
6	Charles Cruchon (FRA)	Biguet-Dunlop	+ 50' 00"
7	Aldo Bettini (ITA)	Lone rider	+ 51' 00"
8	Cyrille van Hauwaert (BEL)	Alcyon-Dunlop	+ 54' 00"
9	Louis Trousselier (FRA)	Alcyon-Dunlop	s.t.
10	Attilio Zavatti (ITA)	Legnano	+ 1h 12' 00"

General classification after stage 6

	Rider	Team	Points
1	François Faber (LUX)	Alcyon-Dunlop	7
2	Gustave Garrigou (FRA)	Alcyon-Dunlop	24
3	Cyrille van Hauwaert (BEL)	Alcyon-Dunlop	32
4			
5			
6			
7			
8			
9			
10			

== Stage 7 ==
17 July 1909 — Nice to Nîmes, 345 km (214 mi)

Stage 7 result

Rank	Rider	Team	Time
1	Ernest Paul (LUX)	Lone rider	12h 09' 00"
2	Louis Trousselier (FRA)	Alcyon-Dunlop	+ 17' 00"
3	Gustave Garrigou (FRA)	Alcyon-Dunlop	s.t.
4	François Faber (LUX)	Alcyon-Dunlop	s.t.
5	Jean Alavoine (FRA)	Alcyon-Dunlop	s.t.
6	Charles Cruchon (FRA)	Biguet-Dunlop	+ 18' 00"
7	Paul Duboc (FRA)	Alcyon-Dunlop	+ 23' 00"
8	Cyrille van Hauwaert (BEL)	Alcyon-Dunlop	+ 32' 00"
9	Constant Ménager (FRA)	Le Globe	+ 43' 00"
10	Georges Fleury (FRA)	Le Globe	s.t.

General classification after stage 7

	Rider	Team	Points
1	François Faber (LUX)	Alcyon-Dunlop	11
2	Gustave Garrigou (FRA)	Alcyon-Dunlop	27
3	Cyrille van Hauwaert (BEL)	Alcyon-Dunlop	40
4			
5			
6			
7			
8			
9			
10			
