= 1909 Tour de France =

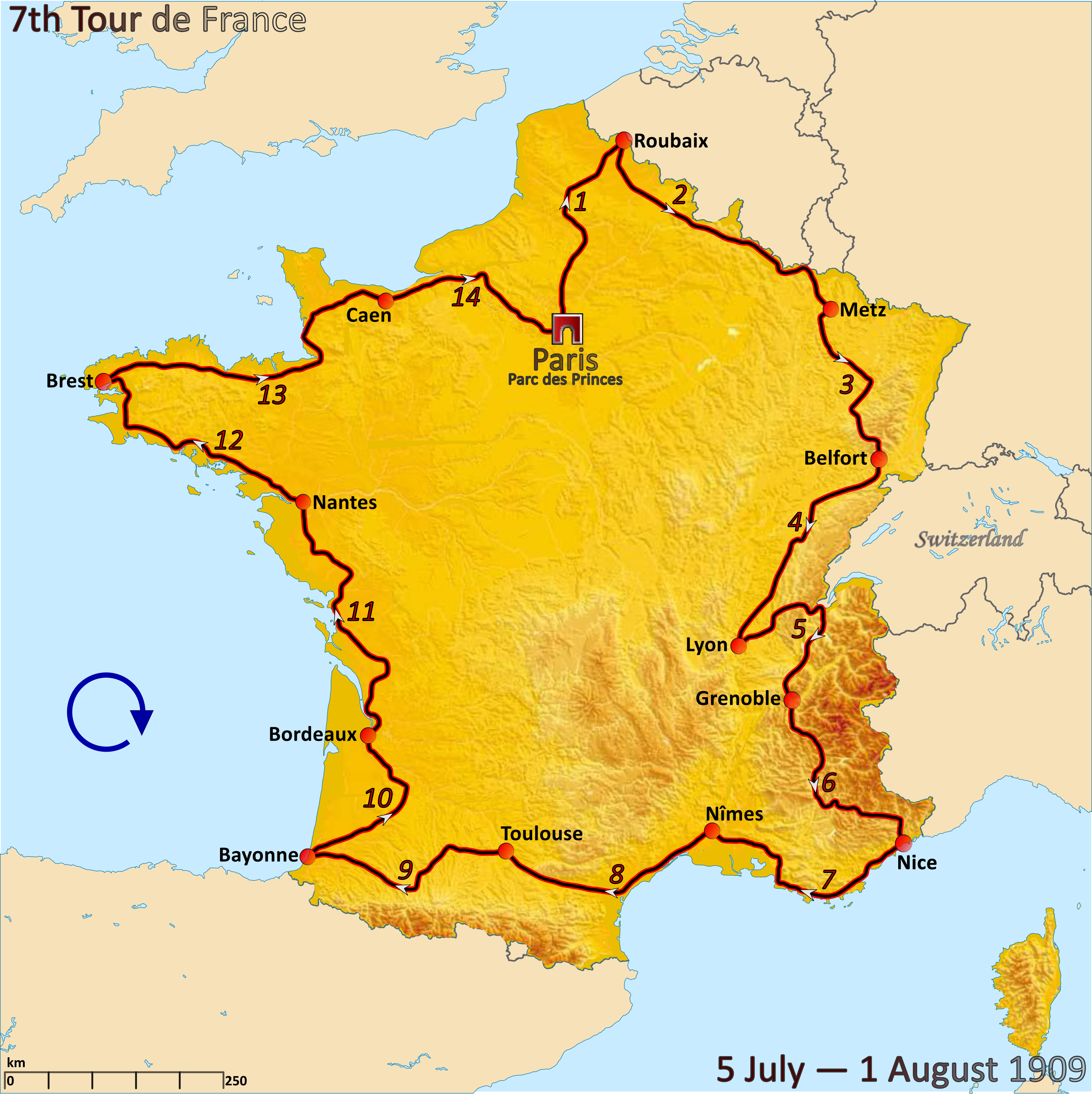
- Route of the 1909 Tour de France followed clockwise, starting in Paris

Race details
- Dates: 5 July – 1 August 1909
- Stages: 14
- Distance: 4,497 km (2,794 mi)
- Winning time: 37 points

Results
	Winner	François Faber (LUX)
	Second	Gustave Garrigou (FRA)
	Third	Jean Alavoine (FRA)

The 1909 Tour de France was the seventh edition of the Tour de France, taking place from 5 July to 1 August. It consisted of 14 stages over 4,497 kilometres (2,794 mi), ridden at an average 28.658 km/h. The results were computed by points accorded finishing positions on each stage, the rider with fewest points at the end of the race winning the race. The stages were approximately the same as in the 1907 and 1908 Tour de France.

Because Lucien Petit-Breton, the winner of the Tour de France in 1907 and 1908, did not enter, the runner-up of 1908, François Faber, was the favourite. Faber went on to win six of the 14 stages and won the race easily.

== Innovations and changes ==
The 1909 Tour de France was again decided by the point system: the winner of a stage received one point, the second placed cyclist two points, and so on. The cyclist with the fewest points at the end of the race was the winner. After the eighth stage, the classification was cleaned up, by removing the cyclists from the result of the previous stages and recalculating the points of the remaining cyclists. This happened again after the thirteenth stage.

In 1908, the cyclists had to use Tour-supplied frames; this rule was abandoned in 1909. The bicycles were still marked with a stamp, to ensure that the riders only used one bicycle.

For the first time, cyclists could enter the race in teams, although technically they were still considered sponsored individuals.

In the previous Tours, the Tour organisation had become embarrassed by cyclists urinating in front of spectators, so at the check points obligatory bathrooms were installed.

== Teams ==
The winner of the previous two editions, Lucien Petit-Breton, was not competing in 1909. Petit-Breton expected his former teammate François Faber, who had become second in 1908, to win the race. Faber had transferred from the Peugeot team, that had dominated the 1908 edition, to the Alcyon team.

A new record of 150 cyclists started the race. The previous Tours had been successful, and similar races were initiated in other countries (most notably the Tour of Belgium, which started in 1908 and the Giro d'Italia, which started in 1909). The Tour de France was still the major race where the best cyclists came, and it was the first large-scale invasion of foreign stars. In total, 19 Italians, 5 Belgians, 4 Swiss, 1 German and 1 Luxembourgian started the race.

Because cyclists could enter the race as sponsored cyclists, there were two classes of cyclists: cyclists with sponsors and cyclists without sponsors. There were seven different sponsors in the race (Nil–Supra, Alcyon, Biguet–Dunlop, Le Globe, Atala, Legnano and Felsina), with three to six cyclists. The majority of the cyclists, 112 in total, were not sponsored but were in the Isolé class, the class for cyclists without a sponsor.

== Race overview ==
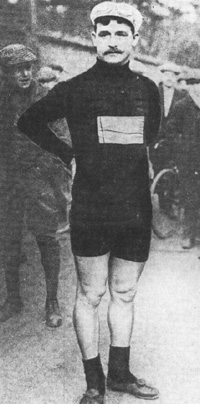
François Faber, winner of five consecutive stages in the 1909 Tour de France.

The 1909 Tour de France was considered the most difficult one so far, because of the cold temperatures, the rain and snow. The first stage was won by Belgian Cyrille van Hauwaert, the first Belgian stage victory ever. As a result, he was leading also the race, the first time in the Tour de France history that a non-Frenchman was leading the race. (Note: In the 1904 Tour de France, after the disqualifications, Swiss Michel Frédérick and Belgian Emile Lombard retroactively had led the race after the first and second stage, but this was not acknowledged during the race.) François Faber, the pre-race favourite, finished in second place.

During that first stage, the weather had been reasonable, but at night the storm started. Faber was best fit to those conditions, and he won the 2nd, 3rd, 4th, 5th and 6th stage, this record of five stages in a row has not been broken since. In stage two, Faber broke away halfway the stage, and rode the last 200 km alone. In the third stage (at a temperature of only 4 degrees Celsius), Faber's chain broke in the last kilometre, and he had to run his bicycle across the finish line. In the fifth stage, Faber was blown of the road by a strong wind, but remounted. Later, he was knocked down by a horse that also kicked his bicycle away. Faber remounted again, and won the stage with a five-minute margin. In the sixth stage, 20,000 fans had come to see Faber win his fifth stage in a row, which he did. The 7th stage was won by Ernest Paul, Faber's half brother. Because of the bad weather, already 50 cyclists (1/3 of the field) had quit the race at that point.

The Tour organisers asked Faber to calm down, in order to keep the Tour exciting. His team leader agreed and Faber slowed down and let others win stages; his leading position was never endangered.

In the ninth stage, Faber finished in 10th place at 46 minutes from the winner, his worst performance of the race. He was still leading the race with 26 points, whereas second placed cyclist Garrigou had 40 points.

It seemed impossible to beat Faber in this Tour, and the question became who would finish in second place. Gustave Garrigou was in second place, but Jean Alavoine was getting close to him. Garrigou had more experience, and remained second. In the fourteenth stage, Jean Alavoine was leading when his bicycle broke, with only 10 km to go. Changing bicycles was not allowed, so Alavoine ran the last 10 km with his bicycle on his shoulders, and still won the stage with a margin of 6 minutes and 30 seconds.

== Results ==
The Alcyon-sponsored cyclists dominated the 1909 Tour de France, winning 13 out of 14 stages. Only the 7th stage was not won by a cyclist sponsored by Alcyon, but by Ernest Paul, without sponsor.

=== Stage results ===
Stage characteristics and winners
Stage	Date	Course	Distance	Type (Note: In 1909, there was no distinction in the rules between plain stages and mountain stages; the icons shown here indicate which stages included mountains.)	Winner	Race leader
1	5 July	Paris to Roubaix	272 km (169 mi)	Plain stage	Cyrille van Hauwaert (BEL)	Cyrille van Hauwaert (BEL)
2	7 July	Roubaix to Metz	398 km (247 mi)	Plain stage	François Faber (LUX)	François Faber (LUX)
3	9 July	Metz to Belfort	259 km (161 mi)	Stage with mountain(s)	François Faber (LUX)	François Faber (LUX)
4	11 July	Belfort to Lyon	309 km (192 mi)	Stage with mountain(s)	François Faber (LUX)	François Faber (LUX)
5	13 July	Lyon to Grenoble	311 km (193 mi)	Stage with mountain(s)	François Faber (LUX)	François Faber (LUX)
6	15 July	Grenoble to Nice	346 km (215 mi)	Stage with mountain(s)	François Faber (LUX)	François Faber (LUX)
7	17 July	Nice to Nîmes	345 km (214 mi)	Plain stage	Ernest Paul (FRA)	François Faber (LUX)
8	19 July	Nîmes to Toulouse	303 km (188 mi)	Plain stage	Jean Alavoine (FRA)	François Faber (LUX)
9	21 July	Toulouse to Bayonne	299 km (186 mi)	Plain stage	Constant Ménager (FRA)	François Faber (LUX)
10	23 July	Bayonne to Bordeaux	269 km (167 mi)	Plain stage	François Faber (LUX)	François Faber (LUX)
11	25 July	Bordeaux to Nantes	391 km (243 mi)	Plain stage	Louis Trousselier (FRA)	François Faber (LUX)
12	27 July	Nantes to Brest	321 km (199 mi)	Plain stage	Gustave Garrigou (FRA)	François Faber (LUX)
13	29 July	Brest to Caen	424 km (263 mi)	Plain stage	Paul Duboc (FRA)	François Faber (LUX)
14	1 August	Caen to Paris	250 km (160 mi)	Plain stage	Jean Alavoine (FRA)	François Faber (LUX)
	Total		4,497 km (2,794 mi)			

=== General classification ===
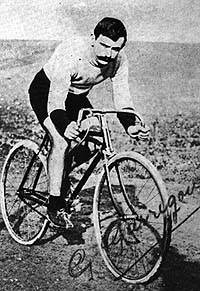
Gustave Garrigou, second place in the final classification of the 1909 Tour de France.

The general classification was calculated by points: at every stage, the winner was given one point, the next cyclist two points, etc. After the eighth stage, when only 71 cyclists were still in the race, the points given in the first eight stages were redistributed among the remaining cyclists, in accordance with their positions in those stages. Of the 150 starting cyclists, 55 finished. François Faber is one of the youngest Tour de France winners in history at only 22 years and 7 months; as of 2019, only Henri Cornet in 1904 was younger (19 years and 11 months).

Final general classification (1–10)
Rank	Rider	Team	Points
1	François Faber (LUX)	Alcyon	37
2	Gustave Garrigou (FRA)	Alcyon	57
3	Jean Alavoine (FRA)	Alcyon	66
4	Paul Duboc (FRA)	Alcyon	70
5	Cyrille van Hauwaert (BEL)	Alcyon	92
6	Ernest Paul (FRA)	–	95
7	Constant Ménager (FRA)	Le Globe	102
8	Louis Trousselier (FRA)	Alcyon	114
9	Eugène Christophe (FRA)	–	139
10	Aldo Bettini (ITA)	–	142

Final general classification (11–55)
Rank	Rider	Sponsor	Points
11	Julien Maitron (FRA)	Le Globe	148
12	Georges Fleury (FRA)	Le Globe	152
13	Alfred Faure (FRA)	–	205
14	Mario Gajoni (ITA)	Legnano	210
15	Attilio Zavatti (ITA)	Legnano	241
16	Jules Deloffre (FRA)	Nil–Supra	252
17	Joseph Habierre (FRA)	–	296
18	Ildebrando Gamberini (ITA)	Felsina	305
19	Alfred Le Bars (FRA)	–	317
20	Emile Lachaise (FRA)	–	327
21	Lucien Leman (FRA)	–	341
22	Léon Rabot (FRA)	–	343
23	Georges Oudin (FRA)	–	345
24	Armédee Dutiron (FRA)	–	351
24	Robert Lecointe (FRA)	–	351
26	Pierre Langlade (FRA)	–	404
27	Angelo Magagnoli (ITA)	Felsina	407
28	Antony Wattelier (FRA)	–	411
29	Alfred Vaidis (FRA)	–	450
30	Henri Alavoine (FRA)	–	467
31	Paul Boillat (SUI)	–	471
32	Amleto Belloni (ITA)	–	477
33	René Chaude (FRA)	–	479
34	Joseph Leblanc (FRA)	–	481
35	Auguste Denizot (FRA)	–	484
36	Auguste Dufour (FRA)	–	491
37	Antoine Fauré (FRA)	–	495
38	Albert Lagagner (FRA)	–	518
39	Rodolphe Meili (FRA)	–	548
40	Louis Gardent (FRA)	–	549
41	Alcide Riviere (FRA)	–	556
42	François Roche (FRA)	–	561
43	Lucien Colin (FRA)	–	569
44	André Herbelin (FRA)	–	573
45	Giovanni Perucca (SUI)	–	579
46	Eugène Leroy (FRA)	–	610
47	Camille Mathieu (FRA)	–	613
48	Charles Ponson (FRA)	–	620
49	Paul Piétrois (FRA)	–	633
50	Louis Di Maria (FRA)	–	648
51	Henri Anthoine (FRA)	–	649
52	Henri Ory (FRA)	–	651
53	Ernest Goujon (FRA)	–	659
54	Alfred Guidez (FRA)	–	670
55	Georges Devilly (FRA)	–	713

=== Other classifications ===
Sixth-placed Ernest Paul became the winner of the "isolé" category.

The organising newspaper l'Auto named François Faber the meilleur grimpeur. This unofficial title is the precursor to the mountains classification.

== Bibliography ==
- Amels, Wim (1984). De geschiedenis van de Tour de France 1903–1984 (in Dutch). Valkenswaard, Netherlands: Sport-Express. ISBN 978-90-70763-05-3.
- Augendre, Jacques (2016). "Guide historique" [Historical guide] (PDF). Tour de France (in French). Paris: Amaury Sport Organisation. Archived (PDF) from the original on 17 August 2016.
- Cleijne, Jan (2014). Legends of the Tour. London: Head of Zeus. ISBN 978-1-78185-998-8.
- Heijmans, Jeroen; Mallon, Bill (2011). Historical Dictionary of Cycling. Historical Dictionaries of Sports. Lantham, MD: Scarecrow Press. ISBN 978-0-8108-7175-5.
- McGann, Bill; McGann, Carol (2006). The Story of the Tour de France: 1903–1964. Vol. 1. Indianapolis, IN: Dog Ear Publishing. ISBN 978-1-59858-180-5.
- Thompson, Christopher S. (2006). The Tour de France: A Cultural History. Oakland, CA: University of California Press. ISBN 978-0-520-24760-4.
