= 1909 Tour de France, Stage 8 to Stage 14 =

Cycling race stages

Route of the 1909 Tour de France

The 1909 Tour de France was the 7th edition of Tour de France, one of cycling's Grand Tours. The Tour began in Paris on 5 July and Stage 8 occurred on 19 July with a flat stage from Nîmes. The race finished in Paris on 1 August.

== Stage 8 ==
19 July 1909 — Nîmes to Toulouse, 303 km (188.3 mi)

Stage 8 result

Rank	Rider	Team	Time
1	Jean Alavoine (FRA)	Alcyon-Dunlop	10h 10' 00"
2	Ernest Paul (FRA)	Lone rider	s.t.
3	Cyrille van Hauwaert (BEL)	Alcyon-Dunlop	+ 20"
4	Louis Trousselier (FRA)	Alcyon-Dunlop	s.t.
5	François Faber (LUX)	Alcyon-Dunlop	+ 1' 00"
6	Julien Maitron (FRA)	Le Globe	s.t.
7	Constant Ménager (FRA)	Le Globe	+ 4' 00"
8	Paul Duboc (FRA)	Alcyon-Dunlop	+ 8' 00"
9	Charles Cruchon (FRA)	Biguet-Dunlop	+ 9' 00"
10	Augustin Ringeval (FRA)	Nil-Supra	+ 14' 30"

General classification after stage 8

Rank	Rider	Team	Points
1	François Faber (LUX)	Alcyon-Dunlop	16
2	Gustave Garrigou (FRA)	Alcyon-Dunlop	35
3	Cyrille van Hauwaert (BEL)	Alcyon-Dunlop	41
4			
5			
6			
7			
8			
9			
10			

== Stage 9 ==
21 July 1909 — Toulouse to Bayonne, 299 km (185.8 mi)

Stage 9 result

Rank	Rider	Team	Time
1	Constant Ménager (FRA)	Le Globe	9h 59' 00"
2	Julien Maitron (FRA)	Le Globe	+ 4' 00"
3	Georges Fleury (FRA)	Le Globe	+ 4' 10"
4	Jean Alavoine (FRA)	Alcyon-Dunlop	+ 13' 00"
5	Gustave Garrigou (FRA)	Alcyon-Dunlop	+ 14' 00"
6	Paul Duboc (FRA)	Alcyon-Dunlop	s.t.
7	Louis Trousselier (FRA)	Alcyon-Dunlop	s.t.
8	Ernest Paul (FRA)	Lone rider	s.t.
9	Eugène Christophe (FRA)	Lone rider	+ 23' 00"
10	François Faber (LUX)	Alcyon-Dunlop	+ 46' 00"

General classification after stage 9

Rank	Rider	Team	Points
1	François Faber (LUX)	Alcyon-Dunlop	26
2	Gustave Garrigou (FRA)	Alcyon-Dunlop	40
3	Cyrille van Hauwaert (BEL)	Alcyon-Dunlop	46
4			
5			
6			
7			
8			
9			
10			

== Stage 10 ==
23 July 1909 — Bayonne to Bordeaux, 269 km (167 mi)

Stage 10 result

Rank	Rider	Team	Time
1	François Faber (LUX)	Alcyon-Dunlop	8h 02' 00"
2	Paul Duboc (FRA)	Alcyon-Dunlop	s.t.
3	Gustave Garrigou (FRA)	Alcyon-Dunlop	+ 7' 00"
4	Louis Trousselier (FRA)	Alcyon-Dunlop	s.t.
5	Eugène Christophe (FRA)	Lone rider	+ 13' 00"
6	Aldo Bettini (ITA)	Lone rider	+ 19' 00"
7	Charles Cruchon (FRA)	Biguet-Dunlop	+ 19' 20"
8	Frédéric Saillot (FRA)	Biguet-Dunlop	+ 33' 00"
9	Georges Fleury (FRA)	Le Globe	+ 47' 00"
10	Ernest Paul (FRA)	Lone rider	+ 55' 00"

General classification after stage 10

Rank	Rider	Team	Points
1	François Faber (LUX)	Alcyon-Dunlop	27
2	Gustave Garrigou (FRA)	Alcyon-Dunlop	43
3	Paul Duboc (FRA)	Alcyon-Dunlop	58
4			
5			
6			
7			
8			
9			
10			

== Stage 11 ==
25 July 1909 — Bordeaux to Nantes, 391 km (243 mi)

Stage 11 result

Rank	Rider	Team	Time
1	Louis Trousselier (FRA)	Alcyon-Dunlop	12h 47' 00"
2	François Faber (LUX)	Alcyon-Dunlop	+ 8' 00"
3	Jean Alavoine (FRA)	Alcyon-Dunlop	+ 9' 00"
4	Paul Duboc (FRA)	Alcyon-Dunlop	s.t.
5	Eugène Christophe (FRA)	Lone rider	s.t.
6	Gustave Garrigou (FRA)	Alcyon-Dunlop	+ 20' 00"
7	Ernest Paul (FRA)	Lone rider	+ 38' 00"
8	Jules Deloffre (FRA)	Nil-Supra	+ 1h 44' 00"
9	Aldo Bettini (ITA)	Lone rider	s.t.
10	Cyrille van Hauwaert (BEL)	Alcyon-Dunlop	s.t.

General classification after stage 11

Rank	Rider	Team	Points
1	François Faber (LUX)	Alcyon-Dunlop	29
2	Gustave Garrigou (FRA)	Alcyon-Dunlop	49
3	Paul Duboc (FRA)	Alcyon-Dunlop	62
4			
5			
6			
7			
8			
9			
10			

== Stage 12 ==
27 July 1909 — Nantes to Brest, 321 km (199 mi)

Stage 12 result

Rank	Rider	Team	Time
1	Gustave Garrigou (FRA)	Alcyon-Dunlop	11h 18' 00"
2	François Faber (LUX)	Alcyon-Dunlop	+ 7' 00"
3	Cyrille van Hauwaert (BEL)	Alcyon-Dunlop	+ 8' 00"
4	Jean Alavoine (FRA)	Alcyon-Dunlop	s.t.
5	Paul Duboc (FRA)	Alcyon-Dunlop	s.t.
6	Louis Trousselier (FRA)	Alcyon-Dunlop	s.t.
7	Ernest Paul (FRA)	Lone rider	s.t.
8	Aldo Bettini (ITA)	Lone rider	s.t.
9	Jules Deloffre (FRA)	Nil-Supra	+ 21' 00"
10	Mario Gajoni (ITA)	Legnano	+ 37' 00"

General classification after stage 12

Rank	Rider	Team	Points
1	François Faber (LUX)	Alcyon-Dunlop	31
2	Gustave Garrigou (FRA)	Alcyon-Dunlop	50
3	Paul Duboc (FRA)	Alcyon-Dunlop	67
4			
5			
6			
7			
8			
9			
10			

== Stage 13 ==
29 July 1909 — Brest to Caen, 424 km (263 mi)

Stage 13 result

Rank	Rider	Team	Time
1	Paul Duboc (FRA)	Alcyon-Dunlop	15h 02' 00"
2	Jean Alavoine (FRA)	Alcyon-Dunlop	+ 7' 00"
3	François Faber (LUX)	Alcyon-Dunlop	s.t.
4	Louis Trousselier (FRA)	Alcyon-Dunlop	s.t.
5	Gustave Garrigou (FRA)	Alcyon-Dunlop	s.t.
6	Cyrille van Hauwaert (BEL)	Alcyon-Dunlop	s.t.
7	Ernest Paul (FRA)	Lone rider	+ 32' 00"
8	Eugène Christophe (FRA)	Lone rider	s.t.
9	Aldo Bettini (ITA)	Lone rider	s.t.
10	Julien Maitron (FRA)	Le Globe	+ 48' 00"

General classification after stage 13

Rank	Rider	Team	Points
1	François Faber (LUX)	Alcyon-Dunlop	34
2	Gustave Garrigou (FRA)	Alcyon-Dunlop	53
3	Paul Duboc (FRA)	Alcyon-Dunlop	65
4			
5			
6			
7			
8			
9			
10			

== Stage 14 ==
1 August 1909 — Caen to Paris, 250 km (160 mi)

Stage 14 result

Rank	Rider	Team	Time
1	Jean Alavoine (FRA)	Alcyon-Dunlop	8h 53' 00"
2	Louis Trousselier (FRA)	Alcyon-Dunlop	+ 6' 30"
3	François Faber (LUX)	Alcyon-Dunlop	+ 6' 36"
4	Gustave Garrigou (FRA)	Alcyon-Dunlop	+ 7' 32"
5	Paul Duboc (FRA)	Alcyon-Dunlop	s.t.
6	Aldo Bettini (ITA)	Lone rider	s.t.
7	Julien Maitron (FRA)	Le Globe	s.t.
8	Jules Deloffre (FRA)	Nil-Supra	s.t.
9	Ernest Paul (FRA)	Lone rider	+ 8' 00"
10	Eugène Christophe (FRA)	Lone rider	+ 20' 00"

General classification after stage 14

Rank	Rider	Team	Points
1	François Faber (LUX)	Alcyon-Dunlop	37
2	Gustave Garrigou (FRA)	Alcyon-Dunlop	57
3	Jean Alavoine (FRA)	Alcyon-Dunlop	66
4	Paul Duboc (FRA)	Alcyon-Dunlop	70
5	Cyrille van Hauwaert (BEL)	Alcyon-Dunlop	92
6	Ernest Paul (FRA)	Lone rider	95
7	Constant Ménager (FRA)	Le Globe	102
8	Louis Trousselier (FRA)	Alcyon-Dunlop	114
9	Eugène Christophe (FRA)	Lone rider	139
10	Aldo Bettini (ITA)	Lone rider	142
