= Amleto Belloni =

Italian cyclist

Personal information
- Born: Milan, Italy
- Died: 1918

Cycling career
- Sport: Cycling
- Discipline: Road
- Role: Rider

Professional teams
- 1906–1908: Individual
- 1909: Perla–Pirelli
- 1909: Soriani–Pirelli
- 1910–1914: Individual

Amleto Belloni (died 1918) was an Italian professional road racing cyclist who competed professionally from 1906 to 1914.

== Biography ==
Born in Milan, Belloni became like his brother Gaetano Belloni (1892–1980), a cyclist competing in the leading professional cycling races. He is most know for being among the first cyclists to complete two Grand Tours, both the 1909 Giro d'Italia and the 1909 Tour de France, in the same season. Together with Attilio Zavatti, Ildebrando Gamberini and Angelo Magagnoli, he completed both races in 1909, which together consisted of 22 stages covering a total of 6,944.9 kilometres. He finished 33rd overall in the 1909 Giro d'Italia and 32nd overall in the 1909 Tour de France. They established the precedent that would later become one of cycling's greatest endurance achievements. In this inaugural Giro d'Italia in 1909 he was riding in the leading group during the second stage. However, due to a crash when riding towards Ancona he lost contact with the front of the race.

Belloni also competed at other main international cycling races, including recording a top-10 finish in 1907 Milan–San Remo, the inaugural edition of cycling monument Milan–San Remo.

Belloni remained active as a professional until 1914. He died four years later in 1918 during World War I.
