= 1908 Tour de France =

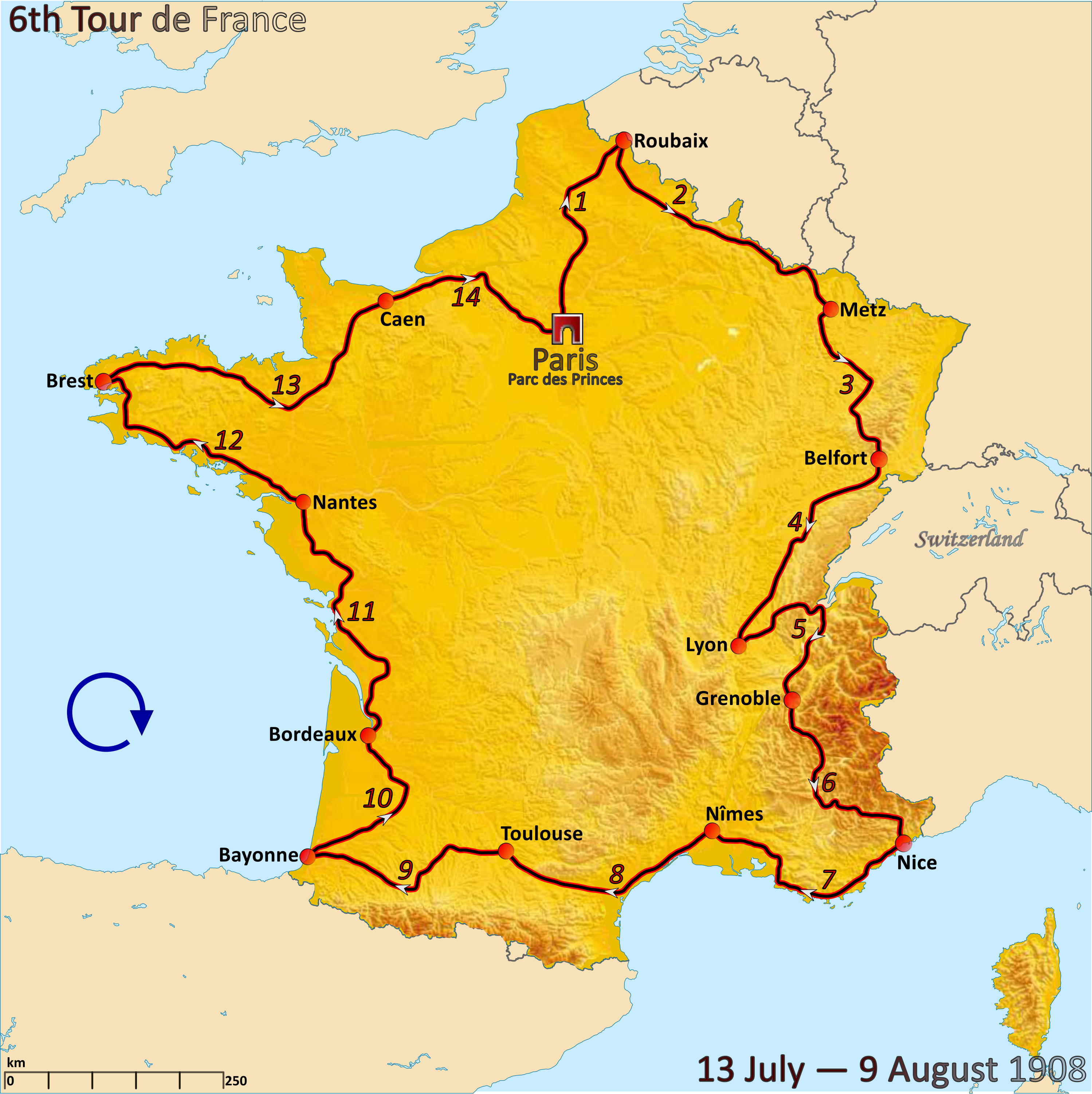
- Route of the 1908 Tour de France followed clockwise, starting in Paris

Race details
- Dates: 13 July – 9 August 1908
- Stages: 14
- Distance: 4,488 km (2,789 mi)
- Winning time: 36 points

Results
	Winner	Lucien Petit-Breton (FRA)
	Second	François Faber (LUX)
	Third	Georges Passerieu (FRA)

The 1908 Tour de France was the sixth running of the annual Tour de France, one of cycling's Grand Tours. It was organised by the newspaper L'Auto, and took place between 13 July and 9 August. The Tour was split in 14 stages, with a total distance of 4,497 kilometres (2,794 mi).

The pre-race favourite was Lucien Petit-Breton, winner of the previous Tour. Petit-Breton dominated the race; he won the general classification and five of the fourteen stages, and thus became the first cyclist who won the Tour twice. For the first time, the final podium in Paris was not completely French: François Faber from Luxembourg ended as second in the general classification, after winning four stages.

== Innovations and changes ==
The 1908 Tour de France followed nearly the same route as the 1907 Tour de France, following the borders of France clockwise. The rules were also the same; the points system was still used instead of the time system to determine the winner.

Before the start, the Tour de France organization announced that all necessary measures had been taken to prevent the regrettable incidents as in 1905, and that the 'Apaches' had 90% chance of being caught and spending time in jail. Dismountable tyres were used for the first time; this meant that cyclists could repair their bicycles easier, and a flat tire cost them less time.

Because tour organiser Henri Desgrange wanted to keep the Tour de France a race between individual athletes, all cyclists had to ride on frames provided by the Tour organisation. The cyclists were not allowed to change bicycles, so the separation in two different classes in the years before had disappeared, and all cyclists started in the same category.

== Participants ==
Before the race started, 162 cyclists had subscribed for the Tour de France, and received starting numbers. 48 cyclists did not start, so the first stage started with 114 cyclists. Cyclists entered the race individually, not in teams; nevertheless some shared the same sponsor and cooperated as if they rode in teams.

The favourite for the victory was Lucien Petit-Breton, the winner of the previous edition. He was sponsored by Peugeot, which sponsored also several other strong cyclists; in the five previous editions of the Tour de France, these Peugeot-sponsored cyclists had together won 20 stages. In addition, Petit-Breton was a skilled bicycle mechanic, which was important because the rules said that cyclists had to repair their bicycle without help. The strongest opposition was expected from the cyclists sponsored by Alcyon, led by Georges Passerieu and Gustave Garrigou.

The Labor-sponsored cyclists started the race in yellow jerseys; in 1908 the yellow jersey for the race leader was not used yet.

French athlete Marie Marvingt had tried to participate in the 1908 Tour de France, but was refused permission because the race was only open to men. She rode the route after the race, and managed to finish it.

== Race overview ==
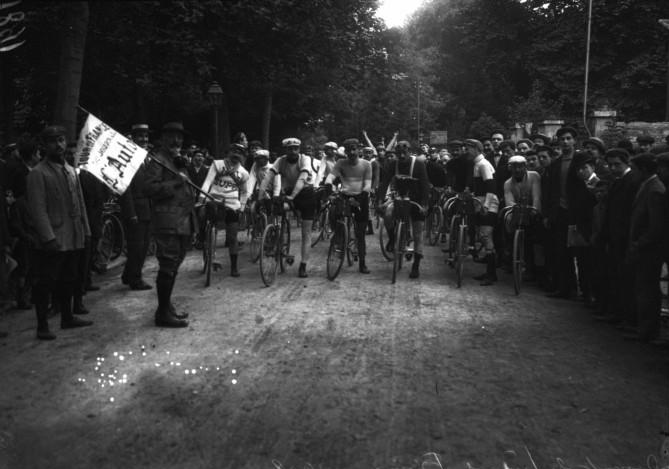
The start of the 1908 Tour de France

At one stage, Henri Desgrange's car broke down, and the tour organiser had to finish the stage in a horse-drawn carriage.

In the first stage, from Paris to Roubaix, the cobbles caused many crashes and flat tyres. It was won by Georges Passerieu, while Petit-Breton finished second. The second stage, from Roubaix to Metz, went through Alsace-Lorraine, which was in 1908 part of the German Empire. As in previous years, nails had been thrown on the road. This stage was won by Petit-Breton with Passerieu in second place. Having both won a stage and finished second in the other, Petit-Breton and Passerieu both had 3 points. Some sources show them joint leaders after that stage, while other sources show Passerieu as single leader. In the third stage, started by Count Zeppelin, the Labor boss sent a telegram to the manager of the team after another crash by a Labor team member (Jean Novo): "After Novo's crash and the mediocre results of the other riders, I have decided to abandon the race. You can all ease up and come back by train." The rest of the Tour would be dominated by the cyclists from Peugeot, who won all the stages. At the third stage, Passerieu finished in 30th place; because Petit-Breton finished second, he was now leading the race by a big margin. The stage was won by Faber. Faber had finished at 49th place in the second stage, so he was no direct threat for the general classification.

The fourth stage to Lyon was during a snow storm. Faber won his second stage, and although he was still behind in the general classification, his two consecutive stage wins made him a dangerous competitor.

In the sixth stage, the Côte de Laffrey and the Col Bayard were climbed, and André Pottier, the younger brother of the 1906 Tour winner René Pottier, reached the tops first. He could not keep the lead, and Faber passed him. Faber lost the lead when he had to stop to fix his bicycle, and at that point Giovanni Gerbi was in the lead. However, three kilometers before the finish, Gerbi's rear wheel broke; Gerbi could not quickly fix his bicycle, so he walked to the finish carrying his bicycle on his back, and finished in seventh place, while the stage was won by Jean-Baptiste Dortignacq.

The seventh stage passed through Crau, in desert-like conditions. Petit-Breton was best suited to this type of weather, and easily won. In the ninth stage, won by Petit-Breton, Faber jumped to the second position in the overall classification, with 57 points, while Petit-Breton was still leading with 18 points. Petit-Breton was at that moment almost guaranteed of the victory, because the remaining stages were all flat, which suited him well.

Petit-Breton crushed the other cyclists in the eleventh stage, dropping all other cyclists one by one. In the remaining stages the other cyclists tried to beat Petit-Breton by escaping on turns, but Petit-Breton reeled them in each time. In the 13th stage, 415 km from Brest to Caen, the winner Passerieu needed more than 16 hours to finish the stage; the last cyclist to finish that stage, Louis Di Maria, finished 23 hours after Passerieue. Faber could pose no threat to Petit-Breton, and Petit-Breton won the Tour de France easily. His worst placement had been the 10th stage where he finished 10th at one second from the winner; all other stages he was in the top four, winning five of the stages.

== Results ==
=== Stage results ===
Stage characteristics and winners
Stage	Date	Course	Distance	Type (Note: In 1908, there was no distinction in the rules between plain stages and mountain stages; the icons shown here indicate which stages included mountains.)	Winner	Race leader
1	13 July	Paris to Roubaix	272 km (169 mi)	Plain stage	Georges Passerieu (FRA)	Georges Passerieu (FRA)
2	15 July	Roubaix to Metz	398 km (247 mi)	Plain stage	Lucien Petit-Breton (FRA)	Georges Passerieu (FRA); Lucien Petit-Breton (FRA) (Note: Passerieu and Petit-Breton both had 3 points after the second stage. Some sources indicate that they were joint leader, other sources indicate that Passerieu was the only leader, see article.)
3	17 July	Metz to Belfort	259 km (161 mi)	Stage with mountain(s)	François Faber (LUX)	Lucien Petit-Breton (FRA)
4	19 July	Belfort to Lyon	309 km (192 mi)	Stage with mountain(s)	François Faber (LUX)	Lucien Petit-Breton (FRA)
5	21 July	Lyon to Grenoble	311 km (193 mi)	Stage with mountain(s)	Georges Passerieu (FRA)	Lucien Petit-Breton (FRA)
6	23 July	Grenoble to Nice	345 km (214 mi)	Stage with mountain(s)	Jean-Baptiste Dortignacq (FRA)	Lucien Petit-Breton (FRA)
7	25 July	Nice to Nîmes	354 km (220 mi)	Plain stage	Lucien Petit-Breton (FRA)	Lucien Petit-Breton (FRA)
8	27 July	Nîmes to Toulouse	303 km (188 mi)	Plain stage	François Faber (LUX)	Lucien Petit-Breton (FRA)
9	29 July	Toulouse to Bayonne	299 km (186 mi)	Plain stage	Lucien Petit-Breton (FRA)	Lucien Petit-Breton (FRA)
10	31 July	Bayonne to Bordeaux	269 km (167 mi)	Plain stage	Georges Paulmier (FRA)	Lucien Petit-Breton (FRA)
11	2 August	Bordeaux to Nantes	391 km (243 mi)	Plain stage	Lucien Petit-Breton (FRA)	Lucien Petit-Breton (FRA)
12	4 August	Nantes to Brest	321 km (199 mi)	Plain stage	François Faber (LUX)	Lucien Petit-Breton (FRA)
13	6 August	Brest to Caen	415 km (258 mi)	Plain stage	Georges Passerieu (FRA)	Lucien Petit-Breton (FRA)
14	9 August	Caen to Paris	251 km (156 mi)	Plain stage	Lucien Petit-Breton (FRA)	Lucien Petit-Breton (FRA)
	Total		4,488 km (2,789 mi)			

After the last stage, there was a timed lap of 666 m at the Parc des Princes velodrome in Paris, won by Henri Cornet in 51.2 s. This was not counted as an official stage and had no influence on the overall classification.

=== General classification ===
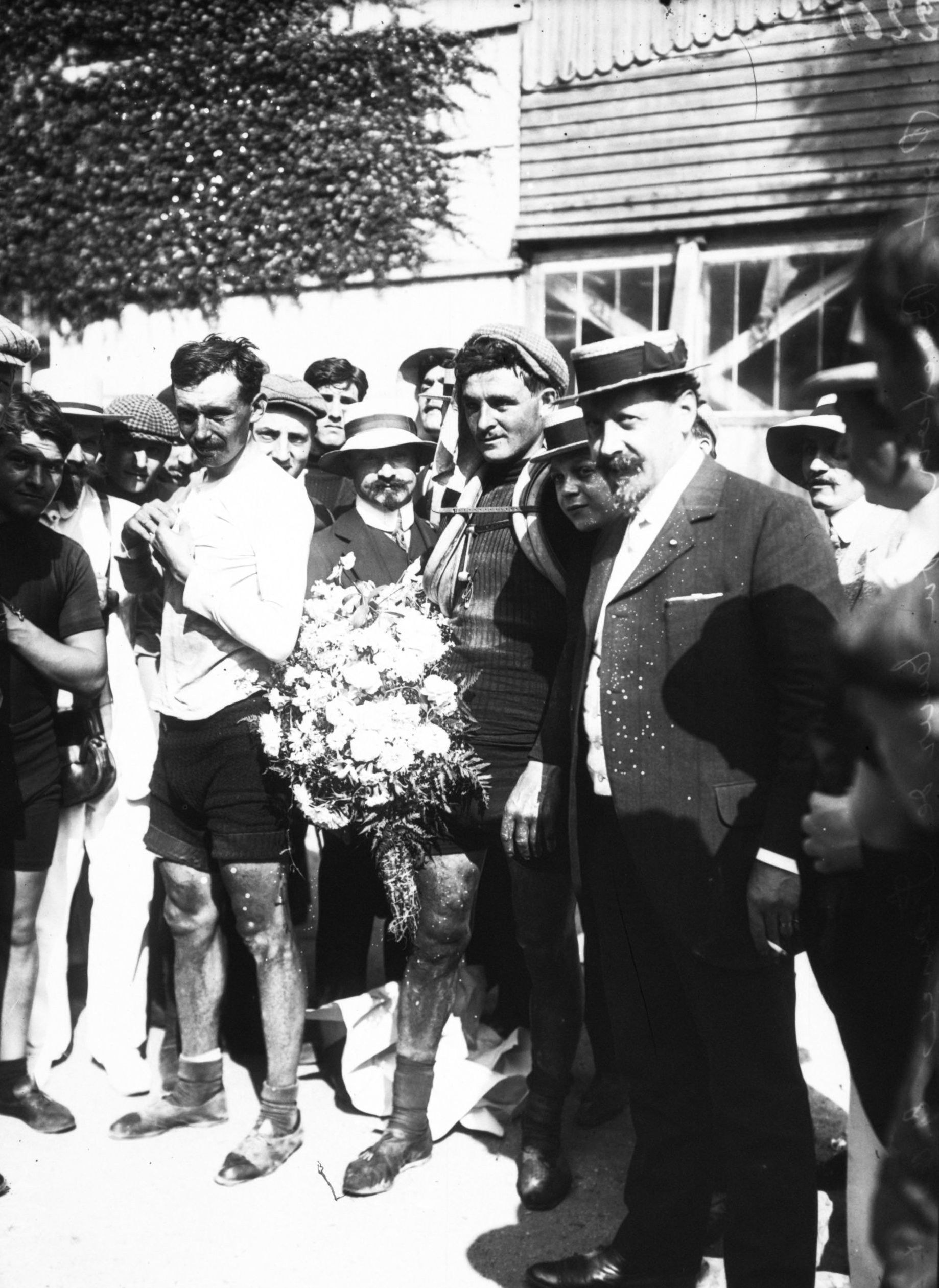
Lucien Petit-Breton, celebrating his victory in the 1908 Tour de France.

The general classification was calculated by points: at every stage, the winner was given one point, the next cyclist two points, etc. After the eighth stage, when only 39 cyclists were still in the race, the points given in the first eight stages were redistributed among the remaining cyclists, in accordance with their positions in those stages. Of the 114 starting cyclists, 36 finished. The Peugeot team had dominated the race; not only did their cyclists win all 14 stages, but they also had the top four places in the general classification. Even though cyclists entered the race as individuals, officially not connected to sponsors, most cyclists had a sponsor.

Final general classification (1–10)
Rank	Rider	Sponsor	Points
1	Lucien Petit-Breton (FRA)	Peugeot–Wolber	36
2	François Faber (LUX)	Peugeot–Wolber	68
3	Georges Passerieu (FRA)	Peugeot–Wolber	75
4	Gustave Garrigou (FRA)	Peugeot–Wolber	91
5	Luigi Ganna (ITA)	Alcyon–Dunlop	120
6	Georges Paulmier (FRA)	Peugeot–Wolber	125
7	Georges Fleury (FRA)	Peugeot–Wolber	134
8	Henri Cornet (FRA)	Peugeot–Wolber	142
9	Marcel Godivier (FRA)	Alcyon–Dunlop	153
10	Giovanni Rossignoli (ITA)	Bianchi	160

Final general classification (11–36)
Rank	Rider	Sponsor	Points
11	Paul Duboc (FRA)	Alcyon–Dunlop	163
12	Clemente Canepari (ITA)	Alcyon–Dunlop	183
13	François Beaugendre (FRA)	Peugeot–Wolber	195
14	Paul Chauvet (FRA)	Peugeot–Wolber	209
15	Eugène Forestier (FRA)	Peugeot–Wolber	231
16	Achille Germain (FRA)	Alcyon–Dunlop	236
17	André Pottier (FRA)	Peugeot–Wolber	237
18	Ernest Paul (FRA)	Alcyon–Dunlop	243
19	Aldo Bettini (ITA)	Peugeot–Wolber	243
20	Giovanni Gerbi (ITA)	Peugeot–Wolber	246
21	Aloïs Catteau (BEL)	Alcyon–Dunlop	272
22	Marceau Narcy (FRA)	Alcyon–Dunlop	307
23	Martin Soulié (FRA)	Alcyon–Dunlop	315
24	Ferdinand Payan (FRA)	Champeyrache	317
25	Noel Combelles (FRA)	Alcyon–Dunlop	335
26	F. Gonzales (FRA)	Peugeot–Wolber	376
27	Alexandre Bodinier (FRA)	Alcyon–Dunlop	374
28	Edouard Wattelier (FRA)	Nil–Supra	388
29	Georges Bronchard (FRA)	Peerless	397
30	Robert Lecointe (FRA)	Alcyon–Dunlop	406
31	Antoine Wattelier (FRA)	Nil–Supra	438
32	Eloi Guichard (FRA)	Terrot	445
33	Léon Rabot (FRA)	Alcyon–Dunlop	453
34	Jean Darche (FRA)	Biguet	469
35	Louis Di Maria (FRA)	–	499
36	Henri Anthoine (FRA)	Labor	512

If the winner would have been determined by the time system as used in 1903 and 1904, Petit-Breton would also have been the winner, with Passerieu in second place, Garrigou in third and Faber in fourth.

=== Other classifications ===
Second-placed François Faber became the winner of the "pneus démontables" category. The organising newspaper l'Auto named Gustave Garrigou the meilleur grimpeur. This unofficial title is the precursor to the mountains classification.

=== Prize money ===
In total, 25000 Francs were distributed in the 1908 Tour de France. The 1908 Tour was split into fourteen stages, and in all but the last stage, the best cyclists received prize money. Between 400 and 500 French Francs was for the winner of each stage, down to 40 Francs for the seventh cyclist to finish. After the last stage, prizes were given for the position in the general classification: 5000 Francs for the winner, down to 100 Francs for the 25th place. All riders that finished were given at least 5 Francs per day. The winner Petit-Breton won 8050 Francs in this way; runner-up Faber won 4595 Francs.

== Aftermath ==
Lucien Petit-Breton became the first cyclist to win two Tours de France. He wrote a book about his life, "Comment je cours sur route". This became a success, and he started to write cycling columns for newspapers. In the next Tour in 1909, Petit-Breton did not participate as a cyclist, but followed the race as a columnist.

== Bibliography ==
- Amels, Wim (1984). De geschiedenis van de Tour de France 1903–1984 (in Dutch). Valkenswaard, Netherlands: Sport-Express. ISBN 978-90-70763-05-3.
- Augendre, Jacques (2016). Guide historique [Historical guide] (PDF) (in French). Paris: Amaury Sport Organisation. Archived (PDF) from the original on 17 August 2016 – via Tour de France.
- Cleijne, Jan (2014). Legends of the Tour. London: Head of Zeus. ISBN 978-1-78185-998-8.
- McGann, Bill; McGann, Carol (2006). The Story of the Tour de France: 1903–1964. Vol. 1. Indianapolis, IN: Dog Ear Publishing. ISBN 978-1-59858-180-5.
- Thompson, Christopher S. (2006). The Tour de France: A Cultural History. Oakland, CA: University of California Press. ISBN 978-0-520-24760-4.
