= Georges Landrieux =

French cyclist

Cycling career
- Sport: Cycling
- Disciplines: Road; Track
- Role: Rider

Professional teams
- 1905–1906: Individual
- 1907: Alcyon–Dunlop
- 1908–1909: Individual

Major wins
- Paris–Le Havre (1908)

Georges Landrieux, also written as Georges Landrieu, was a French track and road racing cyclist who competed in professional road races during the 1900s.

== Biography ==
Landrieux rode as an independent rider in 1905 and 1906 before joining Alcyon–Dunlop for the 1907 season. He returned to riding as an individual for the 1908 and 1909 seasons. He had multiple podium finishes in prominent cycle races of his era, in the inaugural Paris–Reims (1906), Paris–Beaugency (1909) and winning 1908 Paris–Le Havre.

As a track cyclist he was on the podium of the first ever European six-day racing event in 1906. He finished third alongside Antony Wattelier in the six-day race in Toulouse with a total distance of 3211.330 km.

He competed in the 1907 Tour de France, where he had a top-10 finish in the stage 1 and stage 6. In cycling classics he also placed fifth in Paris–Brussels and fifth in Paris–Tours during the same season.

=== General classification results timeline ===
Grand Tour general classification results
Grand Tour	1905	1906	1907
Tour de France	—	—	DNF (DNS stage 10)
Major one-day race results
Race	1905	1906	1907
Paris–Caen	6	4	—
Paris–Brussels	Not held	—	5
Paris–Tours	Not held	—	5

== Major results ==
1905

- 3rd Paris–Reims
- 6th Paris–Caen

1906

- 3rd six-day race in Toulouse
- 4th Paris–Caen
- 4th Paris–Honfleur

1907

- 5th Paris–Brussels
- 5th Paris–Tours
- 13th Paris–Dieppe

1908

- 1st Paris–Le Havre
- 11th Paris–Lille

1909

- 3rd Paris–Beaugency
