= Jean-Baptiste Roux =

French cyclist (1874–1933)

Personal information
- Born: 13 December 1874 Issoudun, France
- Died: 21 February 1933 (aged 58) Issoudun, France
- Height: 1.68 m (5 ft 6 in)

Cycling career
- Sport: Cycling
- Discipline: Road
- Role: Rider

Professional team
- 1906-1908: Indivudial

Jean-Baptiste Roux, also written as Baptiste Roux, (13 December 1874 – 21 February 1933), was a French road racing cyclist.

== Biography ==
Born in Issoudun, in 1874 Roux raced in French road events during the 1900s. His most successful year was 1907. He is most known for his achievement in the 1907 Tour de France, where he finished 18th overall. He rode the Tour as an individual, without having the advantages being in a team. The same year he also recorded a top-10 finish in a cycling monument, in 1907 Paris–Tours.

Between 1906 and 1908 he also competed in other major French cycling races including Paris–Honfleur and Paris–Dieppe.

Roux died in Issoudun on 21 February 1933 at the age of 58. He is still remembered being the earliest and among the best cyclists ever of the Centre region.
