= 1907 Paris–Tours =

Race details
- Dates: 22 September 1907
- Stages: 1
- Distance: 245 km (152 mi)
- Winning time: 7h 37' 00"

Results
	Winner	Georges Passerieu (FRA)
	Second	André Pottier (FRA)
	Third	Émile Georget (FRA)

The 1907 Paris–Tours was the fourth edition of the Paris–Tours cycle race and was held on 22 September 1907. The race started in Paris and finished in Tours. The race was won by Georges Passerieu.

== General classification ==
Final general classification

Rank	Rider	Time
1	Georges Passerieu (FRA)	7h 37' 00"
2	André Pottier (FRA)	+ 1.5 lengths
3	Émile Georget (FRA)	+ 2 lengths
4	Eugène Platteau (BEL)	+ 4 lengths
5	Georges Landrieux (FRA)	+ 9' 30"
6	Marcel Godivier (FRA)	+ 9' 30"
7	Paul Chauvet (FRA)	+ 12' 30"
8	Daniel Lavalade (FRA)	+ 33' 00"
9	Constant Ménager (FRA)	+ 33' 00"
10	Jean-Baptiste Roux (FRA)	+ 33' 20"
