= Chassemy =

- Commune
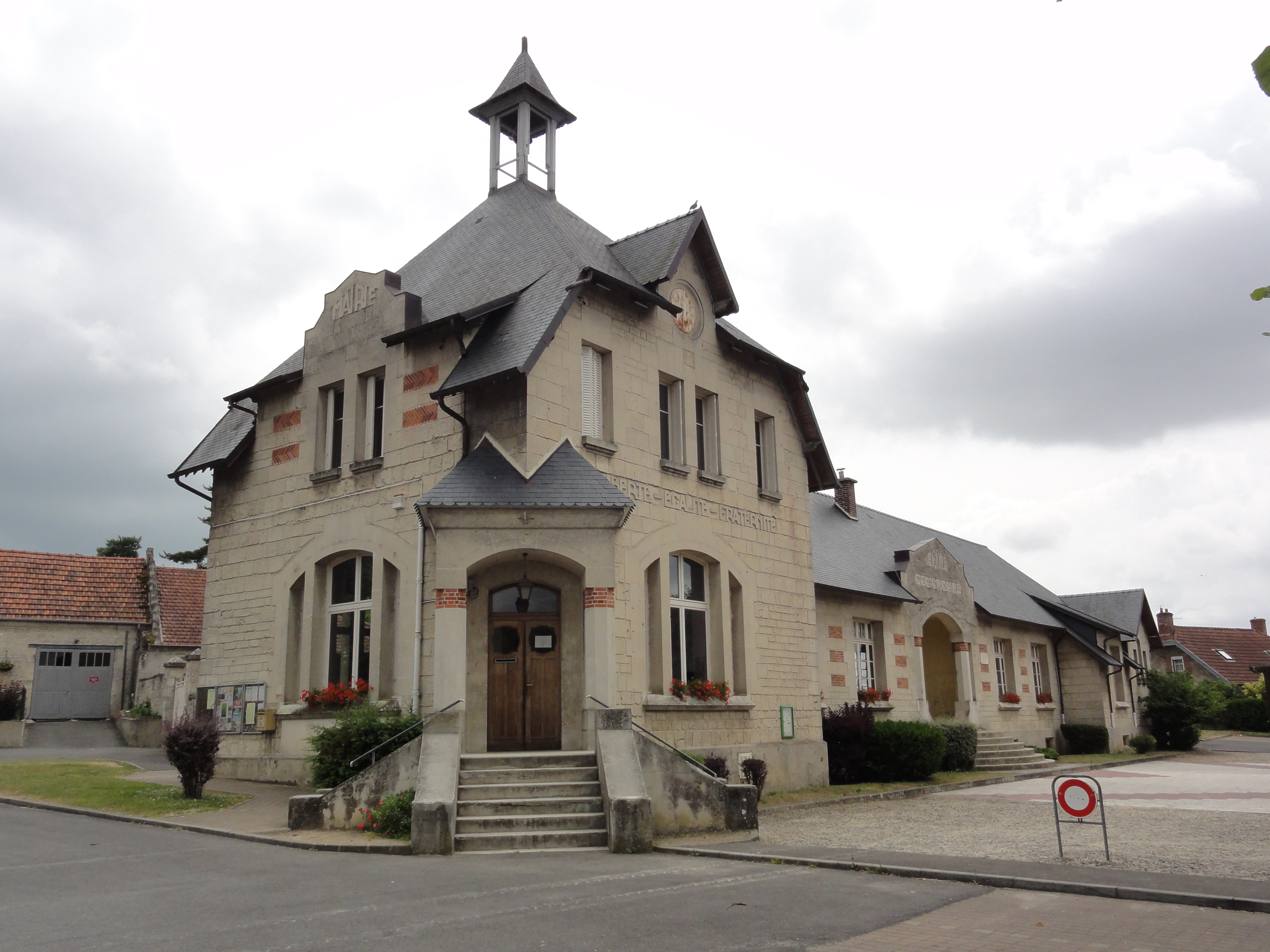
- The town hall and school of Chassemy

- Coat of arms
- Location of Chassemy
- Location within France Location within Hauts-de-France
- Coordinates: 49°22′48″N 3°30′28″E
- Country: France
- Region: Hauts-de-France
- Department: Aisne
- Arrondissement: Soissons
- Canton: Fère-en-Tardenois
- Intercommunality: Val de l'Aisne

Government
  - Mayor (2026–32): Thierry Jeux
- Area^{1}: 10.85 km^{2} (4.19 sq mi)
- Elevation: 69 m (226 ft)
- Highest elevation: 160 m (520 ft)
- Lowest elevation: 43 m (141 ft)
- Population (2023): 895
  - Density: 82.5/km^{2} (214/sq mi)
- Time zone: UTC+01:00 (CET)
  - Summer (DST): UTC+02:00 (CEST)
- INSEE/Postal code: 02167 /02370
- ^{1} French Land Register data, which excludes lakes, ponds, glaciers > 1 km^{2} (0.386 sq mi or 247 acres) and river estuaries.

Chassemy (French pronunciation: [ʃasmi]) is a commune in the Aisne department in Hauts-de-France in northern France.

== Population ==
Historical population
Year	Pop.	±% p.a.
1968	459	—
1975	455	−0.12%
1982	588	+3.73%
1990	674	+1.72%
1999	709	+0.56%
2007	782	+1.23%
2012	827	+1.13%
2017	881	+1.27%
2023	895	+0.26%
Source: INSEE

== See also ==
- Communes of the Aisne department
