= Eugène Platteau =

Belgian cyclist

Personal information
- Full name: Eugène Platteeuw
- Nickname: Flandrien
- Born: 18 September 1886 Roeselare, Belgium
- Weight: 65 kg (143 lb)

Cycling career
- Sport: Cycling
- Disciplines: Road; Track
- Role: Rider

Professional teams
- 1908: Alcyon–Dunlop
- 1909: Dürkopp
- 1911: La Française–Diamant
- 1913: La Française–Diamant

Eugène Platteau, in civil registration Eugène Platteeuw, (born 18 September 1886) was a Belgian professional road and track cyclist who competed during the 1900s and 1910s.

== Biography ==
Born in Roeselare, Belgium, in 1886, Platteau rode professionally for Alcyon–Dunlop in 1908, for the German Dürkopp team in 1909, and for La Française–Diamant in 1911 and 1913.

Platteau was one of the first cyclists in cycling history to be referred to as Flandrien by the French newspaper La Dernière Heure, a designation for riders originating from the Belgian provinces of West and East Flanders. The term would later acquire a broader, more symbolic meaning.

In 1907 Platteu started winning cycling races, including in Laken, Mons and Namur. He also placed fourth in the cycling monuments 1907 Paris–Tours, and was runner-up in the Scheldeprijs in 1907.

The next year he competed professionally with Alcyon–Dunlop. He also won the bronze medal in the 1908 Belgian National Road Race Championships behind Francois Verstraeten and Cyrille van Hauwaert. He also finished third overall in the Tour of Belgium, including achieving four stage podium finishes. In his first Tour de France that year he finished 8th in the opening stage from Paris to Roubaix.

The next year he rode with the German Dürkopp team, and didn't compete that year in the main international races in Belgium and France. As a track cyclist, he won bronze medal at the 1909 Belgian National Track Championships in the motor-paced event, and would become runner up the next year in 1910.

In later years, Platteau had another top-10 finish in the cycling monument 1912 Paris–Roubaix. He also finished among others third in the 1910 Étoile Carolorégienne stage race, competed in the 1913 Tour de France and in his last year he rode to the third place in 1917 Paris–Bourges.

== Major results ==
1907
1st Laken
1st Mons
1st Namur
2nd Scheldeprijs
3rd Bruxelles–Battice
4th Paris–Tours

1908
1st Auvelais
2nd Soumagne–Bastogne
(bronze) Belgian National Road Race Championships
8th Stage 1 Tour de France
3rd Overall Tour of Belgium

2nd Stage 3
2nd Stage 4
3rd Stage 5
2nd Stage 6

1909
(bronze) Belgian National Track Championships, motor-paced

1910
(silver) Belgian National Track Championships, motor-paced
6th Overall Tour of Belgium

3rd Stage 5

1911
3rd Overall Étoile Carolorégienne
3rd Stage 2 Tour of Belgium
8th Kampioenschap van Vlaanderen

1912
9th Paris–Roubaix

1917
3rd Paris–Bourges

=== Grand Tour and Classic results timeline ===
Race	1907	1908	1912	1913
Tour de France	—	DNF	—	DNF
Paris–Brussels	12	—	—	—
Paris–Roubaix	—	12	9	—
Paris–Tours	4	—	—	—
