= Marie Marvingt =

French athlete, mountaineer, aviator and journalist (1875–1963)

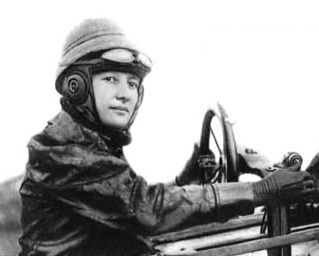
- Marvingt in her Deperdussin aeroplane, 1912
- Born: Marie Félicie Élisabeth Marvingt; 20 February 1875; Aurillac, France
- Died: 14 December 1963 (aged 88); Laxou, France
- Other name: "The fiancée of danger"
- Occupations: Athlete, mountaineer, aviator, nurse, journalist

Marie Félicie Élisabeth Marvingt (French pronunciation: [maʁi maʁvɛ̃]; 20 February 1875 – 14 December 1963) was a French athlete, mountaineer, aviator, and journalist. She was the first woman to climb many of the peaks in the French and Swiss Alps. Marvingt was a record-breaking balloonist, and during World War I she became the first female combat pilot. She won numerous prizes for her sporting achievements including those of swimming, cycling, mountain climbing, winter sports, ballooning, flying, riding, gymnastics, athletics, rifle shooting, and fencing.

She was also a qualified surgical nurse, was the first trained and certified flight nurse in the world, and worked for the establishment of air ambulance services throughout the world. In 1903 Mr. de Château-Thierry de Beaumanoir named her "the fiancée of danger", which newspapers used to describe her for the rest of her life. It is also included on the commemorative plaque on the façade of the house where she lived at 8 Place de la Carrière, Nancy.

== Biography ==
=== Early life ===
Marie Félicie Élisabeth Marvingt was born at 6:30 p.m on 20 February 1875, in Aurillac, the prefecture of the French department of Cantal. Her father was Félix Constant Marvingt, a senior postmaster, and her mother was Élisabeth Brusquin. They married in Metz on 16 July 1861 when he was 48 and she was 32. Before Marie was born, the couple lost three sons in infancy.

The family, including younger brother Eugène (born 1878), lived in Metz, at that time part of Germany, from 1880 to 1889. When Marie's mother died in 1889, the fourteen-year-old found herself in charge of the household, and the family moved to Nancy, where she remained for the rest of her life.

Félix Marvingt was a local billiards and swimming champion, and a dedicated sports fan. With his only son in fragile health, he shared his love of sports with Marie and encouraged her already apparent abilities. By the age of four, she could swim 4 kilometres. She grew to also enjoy many other sports: mountaineering, riflery, gymnastics, horseriding, fencing, tennis, skiing, luging, ice skating, boxing, martial arts, golf, hockey, and football. In 1890, at the age of 15, she canoed over 400 kilometres from Nancy to Koblenz, Germany. She had also learned a number of circus skills, and obtained a driver's license by 1899.

=== Sporting successes ===
Marvingt became a world-class athlete who won numerous prizes in swimming, fencing, riflery, shooting, skiing, speed skating, luge and bobsledding. She was also a skilled mountaineer and between 1903 and 1910 she became the first woman to climb most of the peaks in the French and Swiss Alps including the Aiguille des Grands Charmoz and the Grépon Pass from Chamonix in a single day. In 1905 she became the first Frenchwoman to swim the length of the Seine through Paris. The newspapers nicknamed her "the red amphibian" from the color of her swimming costume.

In 1907 she won an international military shooting competition using a French army carbine and became the only woman ever awarded the palms du Premier Tireur by a French Minister of War. She dominated the 1908 to 1910 winter sports seasons at Chamonix, Gérardmer, and Ballon d'Alsace, where she achieved first place on more than 20 occasions. On 26 January 1910, she won the Léon Auscher Cup in the women's bobsledding world championship.

She enjoyed cycling and rode from Nancy, France, to Naples, Italy, to see a volcanic eruption. In 1908 she was refused permission to participate in the Tour de France because the race was open only to men. Marvingt chose to cycle the course anyway, riding some distance behind the entrants. She successfully completed the grueling ride, a feat which only 36 of 114 male riders had managed that year. On 15 March 1910 the French Academy of Sports awarded her a gold medal "for all sports," the only multi-sport medal they have ever awarded.

=== Achievements in early aviation ===
==== Ballooning ====
Marie Marvingt ascended as a passenger in a free-flight balloon for the first time in 1901. On 19 July 1907, she piloted one. On 24 September 1909, she made her first solo flight as a balloon pilot, and on 26 October 1909, Marvingt became the first woman to pilot a balloon (The Shooting Star) across the North Sea from Europe to England. She won prizes for ballooning in 1909, 1910, and 1911. On 18 July 1914, competing in the 10th Grand Prix of the French Air Club, she became the first woman to cross the English Channel in a balloon. She earned her balloon pilot's license (#145) from the Stella Aero Club in 1910, the second woman to do so (the first was Marie Surcouf).

==== Fixed-wing powered flight ====
In September 1909, Marie Marvingt experienced her first flight as a passenger in an aeroplane piloted by Roger Sommer. During 1910, she studied fixed-wing aviation with Hubert Latham, the Anglo-French rival of Louis Blériot, in an Antoinette aeroplane. She piloted, soloed, and passed her license requirements on the difficult-to-fly Antoinette, the first woman to do so.

Marie Marvingt received a pilot's license from the Aéro-Club de France (Aero Club of France) on 8 November 1910. Licensed No. 281, she was the third Frenchwoman to be registered after Raymonde de Laroche (No. 36) and Marthe Niel (No. 226). In her first 900 flights she never "broke wood" in a crash, a record unequaled at that time.

Marie flew in a number of air meets, bombed a German airbase twice as an unofficial pilot in World War I (see below), flew on reconnaissance missions in the "pacification" of North Africa, and was the only woman to hold four pilot's licenses simultaneously: balloon, airplane, hydroplane, helicopter (in her 80s, Marie flew a jet-engined helicopter, and renewed her pilot's license).

==== Femina Cup ====
On 27 November 1910, Marie Marvingt set the world's first aviation records for women in time aloft and distance flown. Until that time, women's activities had not been recorded. Marie insisted that this flight be officially timed, measured, and verified—first, to establish the need to include women in the record books and, second, because she was competing for the Femina Cup. Recently offered by Pierre Lafitte, owner of the women's magazine Femina, the Femina Cup was to be awarded to the Frenchwoman, duly licensed by the French Air Club, who by the end of 1910 had flown the longest distance in a nonstop flight. Although Marie made another flight bettering her own record, on 21 December 1910, Hélène Dutrieu, cycling champion and fourth woman in the world to obtain a pilot's license, flew even farther. Marie made a last attempt to win the Cup on 30 December 1910 but mechanical failure forced her to land short of her goal. Hélène Dutrieu won the cup. The importance of the Femina Cup lay in initiating recordkeeping for women and in introducing women in the air to the world; international interest had surrounded women competing for the Cup.

=== Air ambulances ===
Marie Marvingt proposed the development of fixed-wing aircraft as air ambulances to the French government as early as 1910. With the help of Deperdussin company engineer Louis Béchereau (who also designed the SPAD fighter), she drew up the first prototype for the first practical air ambulance. By means of her popular conferences, she raised money to purchase one for the French military and the Red Cross. In 1912 she ordered an air ambulance from Deperdussin, but before it could be delivered, the company went bankrupt when the owner, Armand Deperdussin, embezzled company money. (In 1914 Marvingt was drawn by Émile Friant with her proposed air ambulance.)

Marvingt devoted the remainder of her long life to the concept of aeromedical evacuation, giving more than 3,000 conferences and seminars on the subject on at least four continents. She was co-founder of the French organization Les Amies De L'Aviation Sanitaire (Friends of Medical Aviation) and was also one of the organizers behind the success of the First International Congress on Medical Aviation in 1929.

In 1931 she created the Challenge Capitaine-Écheman (Captain Écheman Challenge), which awarded a prize for the best civil aircraft transformable into an air ambulance. In 1934 she established a civil air ambulance service in Morocco and was subsequently awarded the Médaille de la Paix du Maroc (Medal of Peace of Morocco). In the same year she developed training courses for the Infirmières de l'Air (Nurses of the Air) and in 1935 became the first person certified as a Flight Nurse. In 1934 and 1935 she wrote, directed and appeared in two documentary films about the history, development and use of air ambulances: Les Ailes qui Sauvent (The Wings That Save) and Sauvés par la Colombe (Saved by the Dove).

The Flying Ambulance Corps, operated by women pilots and staffed by doctors and trained nurses, was intended to rescue the wounded on the battlefield using aircraft, landing at designated ground stations with crews of nurses, stretcher-bearers, and effective medical aid. By 1939, it appeared vital again and Marie Marvingt had been working on this and similar schemes for nearly thirty years. While organizing "L'Aviation Sanitaire," recruiting women pilots and nurses, she made several visits to the United States to confer with government officials. In France itself, she had been supported by authorities including Marshals Foch and Joffre. Her schemes caught the imagination of the young women of her country and at the start of WW II, this escalated. More than five hundred nurses with at least ten hours' flying experience joined a new corps of flying nurses, some of whom were also parachutists. On 30 January 1955, she received the Deutsch de la Meurthe grand prize from the Fédération Nationale d'Aéronautique (French National Federation of Aeronautics) at the Sorbonne for her work in aviation medicine.

=== War activities ===
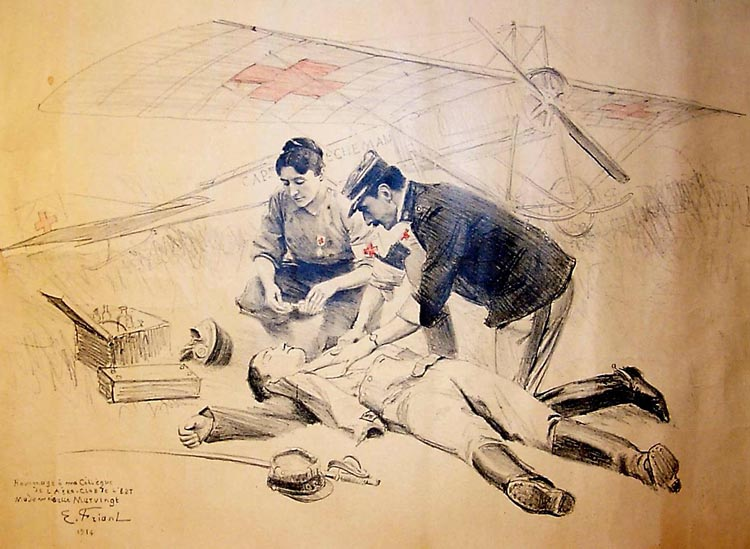
Émile Friant's drawing of Marie Marvingt and her proposed air ambulance, 1914

During World War I, she disguised herself as a man and, with the connivance of a French infantry lieutenant, served on the front lines as a Chasseur 2ième Classe (Soldier, 2nd Class) in the 42ième Bataillon de Chasseurs à Pied (42nd Battalion of Foot Soldiers). She was discovered and sent home but later participated in military operations with the Italian 3º Reggimento Alpini (3rd Regiment of Alpine Troops) in the Italian Dolomites at the direct request of Marshal Foch. She also served as a Red Cross surgical nurse, as a war correspondent on the Italian front, and as a probable gatherer of information for military authorities.

In 1915 Marvingt became the first woman in the world to fly combat missions when she became a volunteer pilot flying bombing missions over German-held territory and she received the Croix de guerre (Military Cross) for her aerial bombing of a German military base in Metz. Between the two world wars, she worked as a journalist, war correspondent, and medical officer with French forces in North Africa. While in Morocco, she came up with the idea of using metal skis for air ambulances so that they could land on desert sand. She also ran a ski school in the desert, teaching people to ski on sand dunes.

In World War II, she resumed work as a Red Cross nurse with the rank of corporal, continued her promotion of the ambulance-airplane, and founded and maintained a home for wounded aviators. She also fought in the Resistance, for which she was given a medal with a star (indicating exceptional contributions). A plaque in Saint-Alvère reads: "Marie Marvingt, Resistance Fighter, Is Honored."

=== Death and posthumous recognition ===
Marie Marvingt died on 14 December 1963, aged 88, in Laxou, a small commune in the Meurthe-et-Moselle department in northeastern France. Her funeral was on 17 December in Saint-Epvre, and she is buried in the Cimetière de Préville, Nancy, France.

In France, there are streets, gymnasia, schools, flying clubs, scout groups, and an apartment complex named after her. In 1987, she was named to the International Women's Sports Hall of Fame. France issued an airmail stamp in her honor on 29 June 2004. Several annual awards are given in her memory including those of the Soroptimist Club of Aurillac, France, and one sponsored by the French Aviation and Space Medicine Association (SOFRAMAS) through the United States Aerospace Medical Association.

=== Philately ===
In 2004, Marie Marvingt was commemorated by a French Airmail stamp bearing the face value of €5.00.

- Designed by Christophe Drochon and engraved by André Lavergne.
- Date of issue 7 May 2004 – Withdrawal date 8 May 2005.
- Horizontal format, 47 x 27 mm; perforations included 52 x 31 mm.
- Two bars phosphorescent.
- Print Mixed – Intaglio / offset; colour polychrome.
- Perforations 13 x 13 1/2
- Issued in a souvenir sheet of ten.
- Michel Catalogue No. 3832.

== Works ==
=== Published works ===
- La Fiancée du Danger (Fiancée of Danger) and Ma Traversée de la Mer du Nord en Ballon (My Crossing of the North Sea in a Balloon) won first prizes in 1948 and 1949 in an international literary competition sponsored by the Women's Aeronautical Association of Los Angeles. Although they are referenced in many newspaper articles and books, neither has ever been located (note that after Marvingt's death, all her possessions were disposed of, and few have ever surfaced).
- Les Ailes qui Sauvent (The Wings That Save) and Sauvés par la Colombe (Saved by the Dove) are mentioned by contemporaries, but they are most likely her notes and scenarios for the two similarly named films she produced. No copies have ever been located.

As a working journalist all her life, most of Marvingt's nonfiction writing consists of the numerous newspaper articles she wrote, sometimes under her pseudonym "Myriel." Although she is said to have written fiction and poetry, this was not an important part of her life and only several poems survive in print.

=== Films ===
- Les Ailes qui Sauvent (The Wings That Save), 1934, and Sauvés par la Colombe (Saved by the Dove), 1935, were both planned, produced, and acted in by Marie Marvingt. She was also the North African location scout, and she directed filming from a plane flying next to the one carrying cinematographer Gaston Chelle. The first film has been preserved in French military archives. The whereabouts of the second are unknown.

== Awards ==
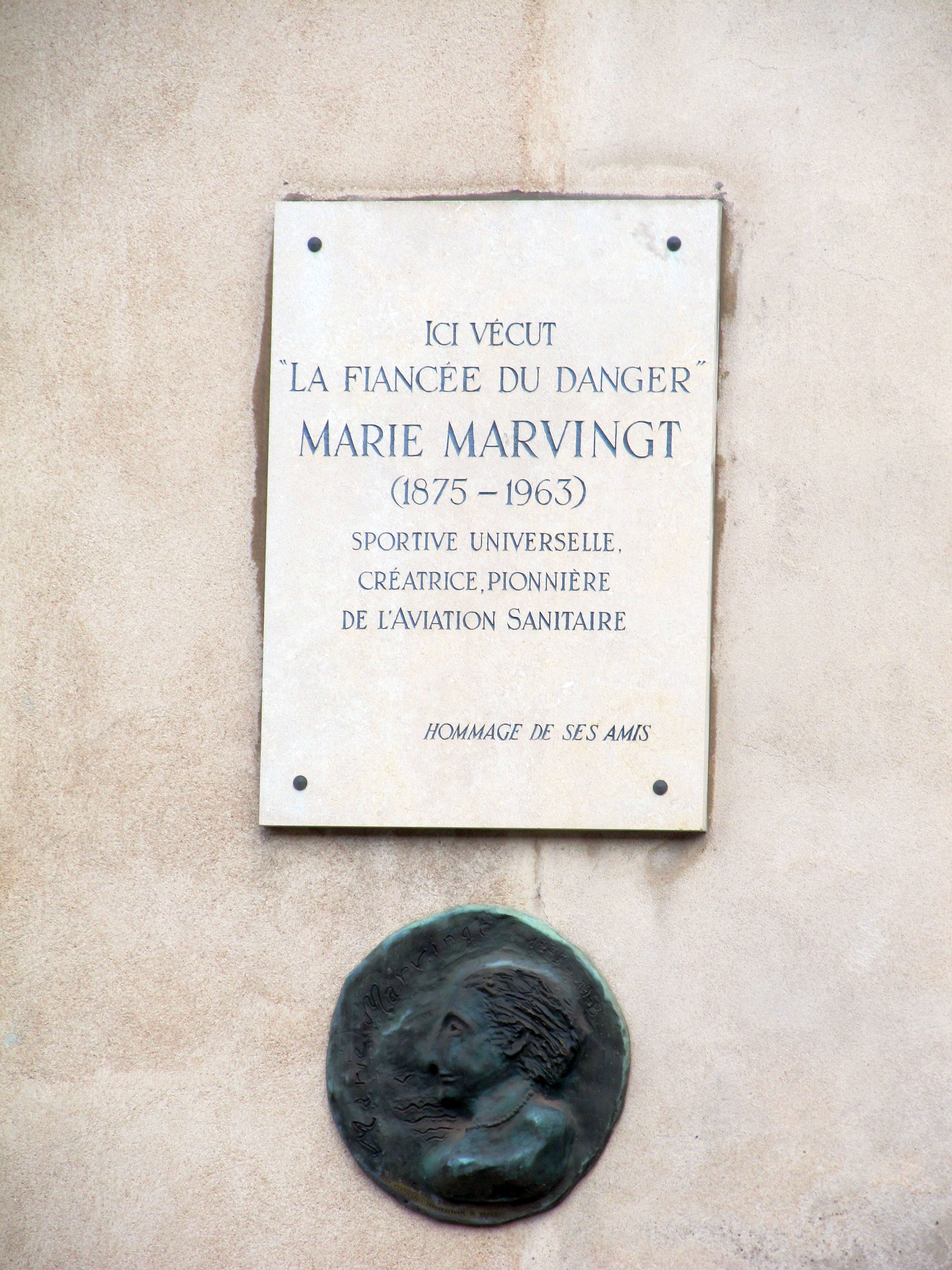
A commemorative plaque in Nancy

Marvingt was highly decorated, with more than 34 decorations, awards, and medals. Among them:

- Legion of Honor: Chevalier 1935; Officier 1949
- Croix de Guerre 1914–1918 with palms
- Gold medal from the French Academy of Sports for excellence in all sports (1910)
- Médaille de la Résistance (avec étoile) for Resistance work in World War II
- Deutsch de la Meurthe grand prize for her work in aviation medicine, 1955
- Chevalier dans l'Ordre de la Santé publique (Chevalier of the Order of Public Health, 1937)
- Palms du Premier Tireur (First-Class Gunner)
- Coupe Léon Auscher (first international women's bobsledding championship)
- Médaille de la Paix du Maroc (Morocco's Peace Medal)
- Commandeur du Mérite Sportif
- Prix de l'Académie Stanislas
- Médaille d'or de la reconnaissance de l'aviation sanitaire
- Gold medal from the Académie Internationale des Sports
- Officier de l'instruction publique
- Palmes Académiques (Academic Palms)
- Médaille de l'Aéronautique (Aeronautics Medal)
- Médaille de la Ville de Nancy (Nancy's Medal of Honor, 1950)
- Médaille d'Argent du Service de Santé de l'Air (Air Force Medical Service's silver medal, 1957)
- Médaille d'Or de l'Éducation Physique (Gold Medal for Physical Education, 1957)
- Honorary diploma and bronze medal from the Ligue Aéronautique de France
- Named to the International Women's Sports Hall of Fame, 1987
- International literary prize in 1948 and in 1949 from the Women's Aeronautical Association of Los Angeles
- Twenty gold medals in Winter Sports, 1908, 1909, 1910
