= Léon Rabot =

French cyclist (1879–1956)

Personal information
- Born: 19 December 1879 Blanquefort-sur-Briolance, France
- Died: 12 August 1956 (aged 76) Blanquefort-sur-Briolance, France

Cycling career
- Sport: Cycling
- Discipline: Road
- Role: Rider

Professional teams
- 1907: Labor
- 1908: Alcyon–Dunlop
- 1909: Le Globe

Léon Rabot (19 December 1879 – 12 August 1956) was a French road cyclist. He was a professional cyclist from 1907 to 1911.

== Biography ==
Rabot turned professional in 1907, when he was a member of the Labor team. That same year he competed in Bordeaux–Paris alongside teammates Augustin Ringeval, François Faber and Lucien Pothier. Rabot finished finished ninth after a long gap behind winner Cyrille van Hauwaert, with his teammage Ringeval finishing in second place.

In 1908 he rode for Alcyon–Dunlop. In the 1908 Tour de France he finished 33rd overall. The next year he further improved. That you he rode for the professional team Le Globe and finished 22nd in the 1909 Tour de France. He remained active in professional cycling until 1911 and he rode his last Tour de France in the 1911 edition.

== Major results ==
1907
9th Bordeaux–Paris

=== Grand Tour and Classic results timeline ===
Race	1907	1908	1909	1911
Tour de France	—	33rd	22nd	DNF (DNS-10)
Bordeaux–Paris	9th	—	—	—
