= Alexandre Gilles =

French cyclist

Personal information
- Born: 29 May 1884

Cycling career
- Sport: Cycling
- Role: Rider

Alexandre Gilles (born 29 May 1884, date of death unknown) was a French racing cyclist. He rode in the 1920 Tour de France.
