= Jean Novo =

Italian-French cyclist (1878–1947)

Personal information
- Full name: Giovanni Battista Novo
- Born: 19 August 1878 Savona, Italy
- Died: 1947 (aged 68–69)
- Height: 1.70 m (5 ft 7 in)

Cycling career
- Sport: Cycling
- Disciplines: Road; Track
- Role: Rider

Professional team
- 1908: Labor

Major wins
- Marseille–Nice (1909, 1911); Nice–Annot–Nice (1911, 1912); Nice–Puget–Thiéniers–Nice (1920); Nice–Toulon–Nice (1922)

Giovanni Battista “Jean” Novo (19 August 1878 – 1947) was an Italian-French road and track cyclist, being active from 1903 to 1922.

== Biography ==
Born in Savona, Italy in 1878, he lived in Nice, France. Active as a cyclist from the 1900s and 1920s he is noted fot his long cycling career.

He was a good climber and is remembered as first great climber of the French Riviera. Together with Alfredo Binda and René Vietto he is regarded as one of the top-three regional riders of all times.

Novo won notable cycling races. He won Marseille–Nice twice, in 1909 and 1911, and also won Nice–Annot–Nice twice in 1911 and 1912 and stage 2 in 1912 Coupe de France de Provence. Later in his career he won Nice–Puget–Thiéniers–Nice in 1920 and Nice–Toulon–Nice in 1922. He had also victories as a track cyclist.

He rode professionally with Labor in 1908, including in the 1908 Tour de France. The Tour was overshadowed by many falls and people who had trown nails on the road. In this Tour he achieved in a top-10 finish in the first stage. In stage 2, Novo suffered many punctures and was left behind by his team. In the third stage Novo crashed. This crash resulted that the boss of the Labor time decided that the whole team withdrew from the Tour, sending a telegram to the manager of the team "After Novo's crash and the mediocre results of the other riders, I have decided to abandon the race. You can all ease up and come back by train." Novo competed also in other main international cycling classics including 1908 Milan–San Remo.

== Major results ==
1908
10th 1908 Tour de France, stage 1

1909
1st Marseille–Nice

1911
1st Marseille–Nice
1st Nice–Annot–Nice

1912
1st Nice–Annot–Nice

1913
3rd Nice–Annot–Nice

1920
1st Nice–Puget–Thiéniers–Nice

1922
1st Nice–Toulon–Nice
