= 1908 Milan–San Remo =

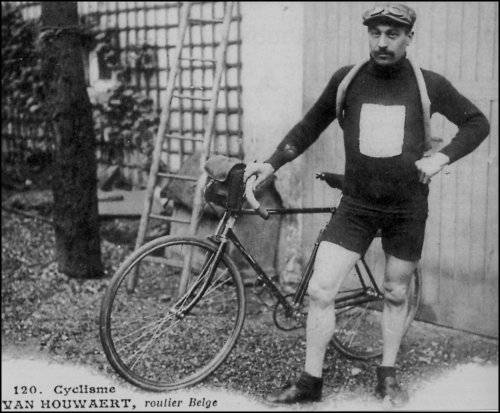
- Cyrille Van Hauwaert won the second Milan–San Remo

Race details
- Dates: 5 April 1908
- Stages: 1
- Distance: 283.4 km (176.1 mi)
- Winning time: 11h 33'

Results
	Winner	Cyrille Van Hauwaert (Belgium)	(Alcyon-Dunlop)
	Second	Luigi Ganna (Italy)	(Atala-Dunlop)
	Third	André Pottier (France)	(Stucchi–Pirelli)

The second running of the Milan–San Remo cycling classic was held on 5 April 1908. The race was won by Belgian Cyrille Van Hauwaert. 14 of 48 starters finished the race.

== Race report ==
The race was affected by miserable weather, with gusty winds and freezing rain from start to finish. The dramatic state of the roads contributed to the harshness of the race, causing several punctures and mechanical failures.

A small group of riders, containing all key contenders, broke clear on the Passo del Turchino. In Masone five of them remained: Belgian Cyrille Van Hauwaert, Italians Rossignoli and Galetti, and French riders Pottier and Lignon. In Finale Ligure Van Hauwaert dropped his last companion Lignon and powered on solo to the finish. In the background Luigi Ganna, André Trousselier and Augustin Ringeval had set off in pursuit. Ganna approached quickly, but Van Hauwaert remained his lead until the finish in Sanremo.

Van Hauwaert had traveled by bike from Belgium to the start in Milan, by means of training. In Paris he was joined by several French riders, including Augustin Ringeval, who accompanied him to Milan.

== Results ==
	Rider	Team	Time
1	(Belgium) Cyrille Van Hauwaert	Alcyon-Dunlop	9h 32' 00"
2	(Italy) Luigi Ganna	Atala–Dunlop	+ 3' 30"
3	(France) André Pottier	Stucchi-Pirelli	+ 6' 25"
4	(France) Augustin Ringeval	Nil-Supra	+ 17' 40"
5	(France) Louis Trousselier	-	+ 33' 00"
6	(Switzerland) Marcel Lequatre	-	+ 47' 00"
7	(Italy) Giovanni Rossignoli	-	+ 1h 5' 00"
8	(France) Jean Morini	-	+ 1h 26' 00"
9	(Italy) Carlo Andreoli	-	+ 1h 26' 30"
10	(Italy) Clemente Canepari	–	s.t.
