= André Pottier =

French cyclist (1882-1976)

Personal information
- Born: 29 May 1882 Moret-sur-Loing, Seine-et-Marne, France
- Died: July 29, 1976 (aged 94) Châtres-sur-Cher, Loir-et-Cher, France

Cycling career
- Sport: Cycling
- Discipline: Road
- Role: Rider

Professional teams
- 1907: Individual
- 1908: Peugeot–Wolber
- 1908: Alcyon–Dunlop
- 1909: Stucchi–Pirelli
- 1909–1910: Individual

André Pottier (29 May 1882 – 29 July 1976) was a French road cyclist.

== Early life ==
Pottier was born in Moret-sur-Loing, Seine-et-Marne. His father, Léon Pottier, originally from Saints near Coulommiers, worked as a miller in Esmans. There he met Anna Guillerot from Villeneuve-la-Guyard, Yonne. He was the younger brother of René Pottier, winner of the 1906 Tour de France.

The family eventually settled in Moret-sur-Loing, where André was born in 1882. The Pottier family was relatively well-off, having investments in the construction of the Suez Canal and the Panama Canal. All the children owned bicycles, a rare thing for the time. In the early 1880s, the family acquired the Hulay mill in Grez-sur-Loing.

As a teenager, André became an apprentice mechanic. He won his first race in 1898, organized by the Vélo Club Nemourien. He later completed military service with the 46th Infantry Regiment. Afterward, he moved to Levallois-Perret and joined the Vélo-Club de Levallois with his brother René. He worked for Panhard automotive factories and, in 1905, claimed victory at Paris–Orléans.

== Amateur career ==
In 1906, Pottier won several amateur events: Paris–Le Havre, Paris–Meaux, and Paris–Amiens. The following year, he repeated a win at Paris–Amiens and added Paris–Honfleur to his palmarès.

== Professional career ==
Pottier turned professional in 1907 and finished second in Paris–Tours. In 1908, he finished third and first French rider in 1908 Milan–San Remo. He placed seventh in 1908 Paris–Roubaix and fourth in Paris–Brussels before riding in the 1908 Tour de France with the Alcyon team. He suffered misfortunes in that Tour: hitting a spectator in the first stage, walking 4 km after an accident in stage two, and damaging his fork in the final stage, forcing him to walk 12 km. Despite setbacks, he finished 17th overall.

== Later years ==
In 1910, Pottier managed an Alcyon store in Saumur for a decade. At age 50, he rode in the 1932 "Critérium des Vieilles Gloires" with fellow veterans Gaston Rivierre, Eugène Christophe, and Jean Alavoine, finishing fourth. He moved to Pont-l'Évêque in 1937, competed again in the same event, and placed third behind Omer Beaugendre.

From 1941, he supported the Vélo Sport Honfleurais and continued racing locally. In 1943, he won a veteran race in Condé-sur-Noireau (40 km in 1h11m) and the Grand Prix de l’Ouest-Éclair. In 1949, at 67, he finished fifth in his last race.

In 1962, he flagged off a stage of the 1962 Tour de France from Pont-l'Évêque to Saint-Malo. In 1969, he moved to Châtres-sur-Cher and died there in 1976. He is buried in Bonloc, Pyrénées-Atlantiques.

== Major results ==
=== Amateur ===
- 1903
  - Champion of CV Nemours
- 1905
  - Paris-Orléans
- 1906
  - Paris-Le Havre
  - Paris–Meaux
  - Paris-Amiens
- 1907
  - Paris-Honfleur
  - Paris-Amiens

=== Professional ===
- 1907
  - 2nd – 1907 Paris–Tours
- 1908
  - 3rd – 1908 Milan–San Remo
  - 7th – 1908 Paris–Roubaix
  - 4th – Paris–Brussels
  - 17th – 1908 Tour de France
