= Ildebrando Gamberini =

Italian cyclist (1884–1951)

Personal information
- Born: 10 September 1884 Ravenna, Italy
- Died: 1951 (aged 66–67)

Cycling career
- Sport: Cycling
- Discipline: Road
- Role: Rider

Professional teams
- 1907–1908: Individual
- 1909: Felsina
- 1910–1911: Individual
- 1912: L'Italiana
- 1913–1914: Individual

Ildebrando Gamberini (10 September 1884 – 1951) was an Italian professional road cyclist active from 1907 to 1914. He achieved a top-10 overall in the 1910 Giro d'Italia and had a podium stage finish in the 1911 Giro d'Italia.

== Biography ==
Born in Ravenna on 10 September 1884, Gamberini began his professional career in 1907 as an independent rider. After two seasons, he joined the Italian team Felsina in 1909, then alternated between riding as an individual and for teams such as L'Italiana.

He participated in four editions of the Giro d'Italia between 1909 and 1912. He made his Giro debut in 1909, placing 24th overall. The following year he delivered his best general classification result, finishing ninth in the 1910 Giro d'Italia. In the 1911 Giro d'Italia, Gamberini took a podium spot in stage 8 behind Lauro Bordin and Lucien Petit-Breton. He finished this edition 15th overall. His final Giro appearance came in 1912, when results were recorded by team ranking.

Gamberini also competed in other international monumental races including the Tour de France, placing 18th in the 1909 Tour de France, two times Milan–San Remo and the Giro di Lombardia. He retired from professional cycling in 1914 and died in 1951.

== Major results ==
1909
24th Overall 1909 Giro d'Italia
18th Overall 1909 Tour de France

1910
9th Overall 1910 Giro d'Italia

1911
15th Overall 1911 Giro d'Italia

3rd stage 8

1912
Team classification result not applicable to individual standings

=== Grand Tour general classification results ===
Stage races	1909	1910	1911
Giro d'Italia	24th	9th	15th
Tour de France	18th	—	—

=== Classic cycle races results ===
Classic cycle races	1909	1910	1911	1912	1914
Milan–San Remo	DNF	DNF	—	—	—
Giro di Lombardia	62nd	—	—	—	—
Giro dell'Emilia	12th	11th	—	—	16th
Giro di Romagna	—	—	14th	13th	—
