= Villotte-sur-Ource =

- Commune
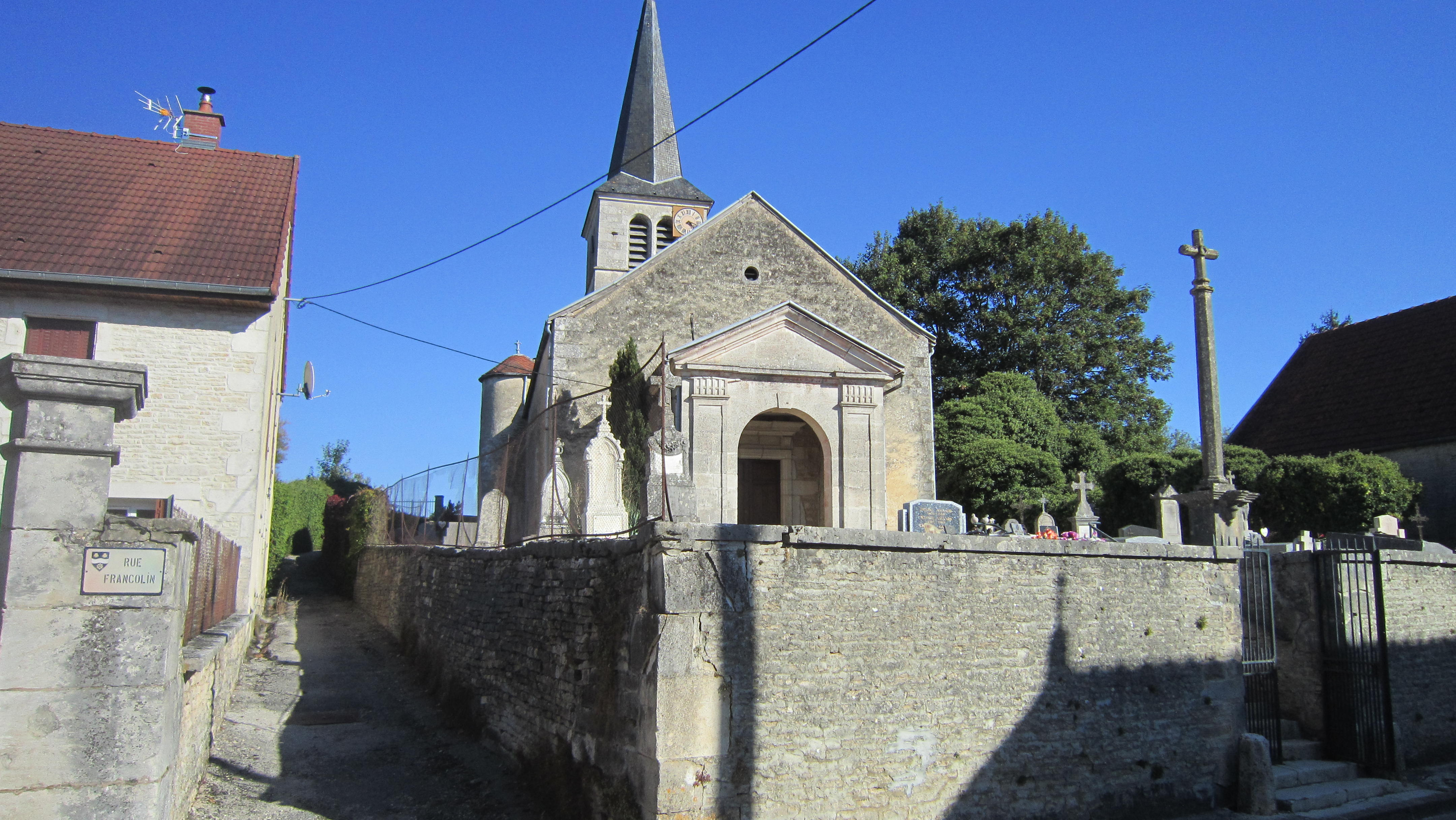
- The church in Villotte-sur-Ource

- Coat of arms
- Location of Villotte-sur-Ource
- Location within France Location within Bourgogne-Franche-Comté
- Coordinates: 47°51′50″N 4°40′48″E
- Country: France
- Region: Bourgogne-Franche-Comté
- Department: Côte-d'Or
- Arrondissement: Montbard
- Canton: Châtillon-sur-Seine
- Intercommunality: Pays Châtillonnais

Government
  - Mayor (2020–2026): Christophe Fouilland
- Area^{1}: 9.49 km^{2} (3.66 sq mi)
- Elevation: 258 m (846 ft)
- Highest elevation: 358 m (1,175 ft)
- Lowest elevation: 235 m (771 ft)
- Population (2023): 110
  - Density: 12/km^{2} (30/sq mi)
- Time zone: UTC+01:00 (CET)
  - Summer (DST): UTC+02:00 (CEST)
- INSEE/Postal code: 21706 /21400
- ^{1} French Land Register data, which excludes lakes, ponds, glaciers > 1 km^{2} (0.386 sq mi or 247 acres) and river estuaries.

Villotte-sur-Ource (French pronunciation: [vilɔt syʁ uʁs], literally Villotte on Ource) is a commune in the Côte-d'Or department in eastern France.

== Population ==
Historical population
Year	Pop.	±% p.a.
1968	86	—
1975	80	−1.03%
1982	86	+1.04%
1990	105	+2.53%
1999	114	+0.92%
2007	113	−0.11%
2012	121	+1.38%
2017	113	−1.36%
2023	110	−0.45%
Source: INSEE

== See also ==
- Communes of the Côte-d'Or department
