= Camille Mathieu =

French cyclist

Personal information
- Born: 4 October 1888
- Died: 14 September 1933 (aged 44)

Cycling career
- Sport: Cycling
- Role: Rider

Camille Mathieu (4 October 1888 – 14 September 1933) was a French racing cyclist. He rode in the 1920 Tour de France.
