= Alexandre Bodinier =

French cyclist

Personal information
- Born: 20 February 1887
- Died: 27 January 1964 (aged 76)

Cycling career
- Sport: Cycling
- Role: Rider

Alexandre Bodinier (20 February 1887 – 27 January 1964) was a French racing cyclist. He rode in the 1921 Tour de France.
