= Henri Anthoine =

French cyclist (1877–1949)

Personal information
- Full name: Henri Anthoine
- Born: 1 May 1875 Blois, France
- Died: 2 November 1949 Paris, France

Cycling career
- Sport: Cycling
- Role: Rider

Henri Anthoine (1 May 1877 – 2 November 1949) was a French racing cyclist. He finished in last place in the 1908 Tour de France.
