= Georges Paulmier =

French road bicycle racer

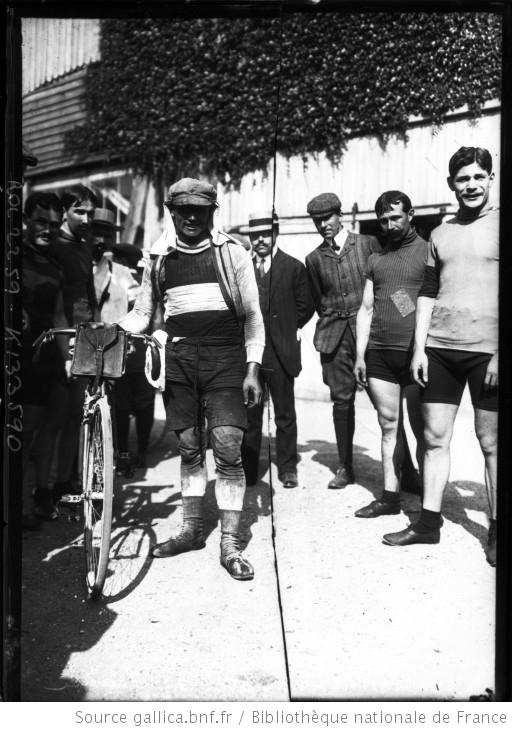
- The cyclist, Georges Paulmier

Personal information
- Full name: Georges Paulmier
- Born: 24 December 1882 Frepillon, France
- Died: 30 December 1956 (aged 74) Chateaudin, France

Cycling career
- Sport: Cycling
- Discipline: Road
- Role: Rider

Professional teams
- 1908: Griffon-Peugeot
- 1910: Le Globe
- 1911: Automoto

Major wins
- 2 stages Tour de France

Georges Paulmier (24 December 1882, in Frepillon – 30 December 1956, in Chateaudin) was a French professional road bicycle racer, who won two stages in the early Tours de France.

== Major results ==
1908
Tour de France: Winner 10th stage
1910
Tour de France: Winner 8th stage
