= Omer Beaugendre =

French cyclist (1883–1954)

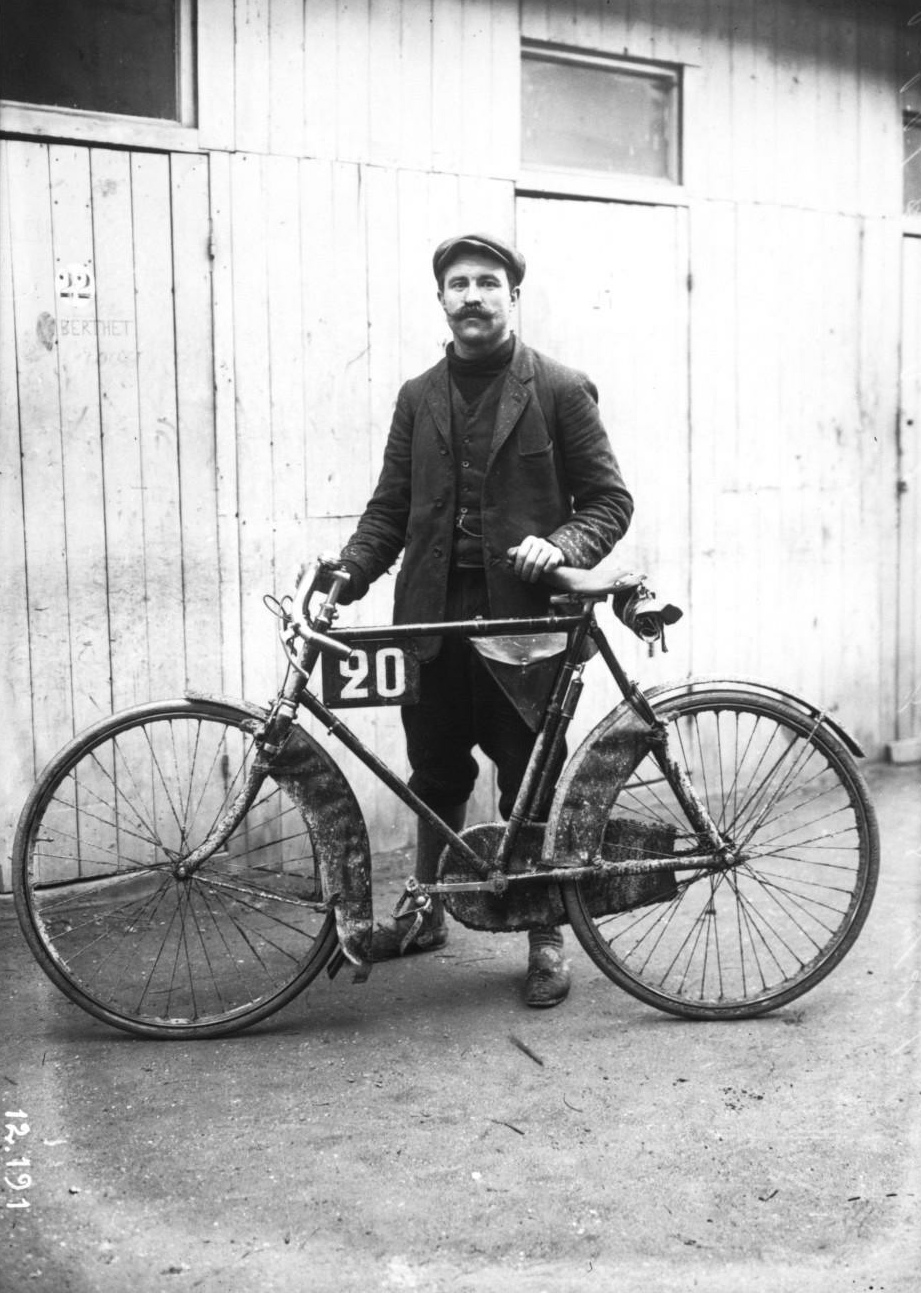
- Beaugendre at a reliability trial in 1910

Personal information
- Full name: Omer Beaugendre
- Born: 9 September 1883 Salbris, France
- Died: 20 April 1954 (aged 70) Salbris, France

Cycling career
- Sport: Cycling

Léon Omer Beaugendre (9 September 1883 – 20 April 1954) was a French cyclist who competed at the 1900 Summer Olympics in Paris and in the 1910 Tour de France. He won Paris–Tours in 1908. He was the brother of the cyclists François Beaugendre and Joseph Beaugendre.
