= Eugène Forestier =

French cyclist

Personal information
- Born: 11 January 1877
- Died: 7 August 1950 (aged 73)

Cycling career
- Sport: Cycling
- Role: Rider

Eugène Forestier (11 January 1877 – 7 August 1950) was a French racing cyclist. He rode in the 1922 Tour de France.
