= Ernest Paul =

French cyclist

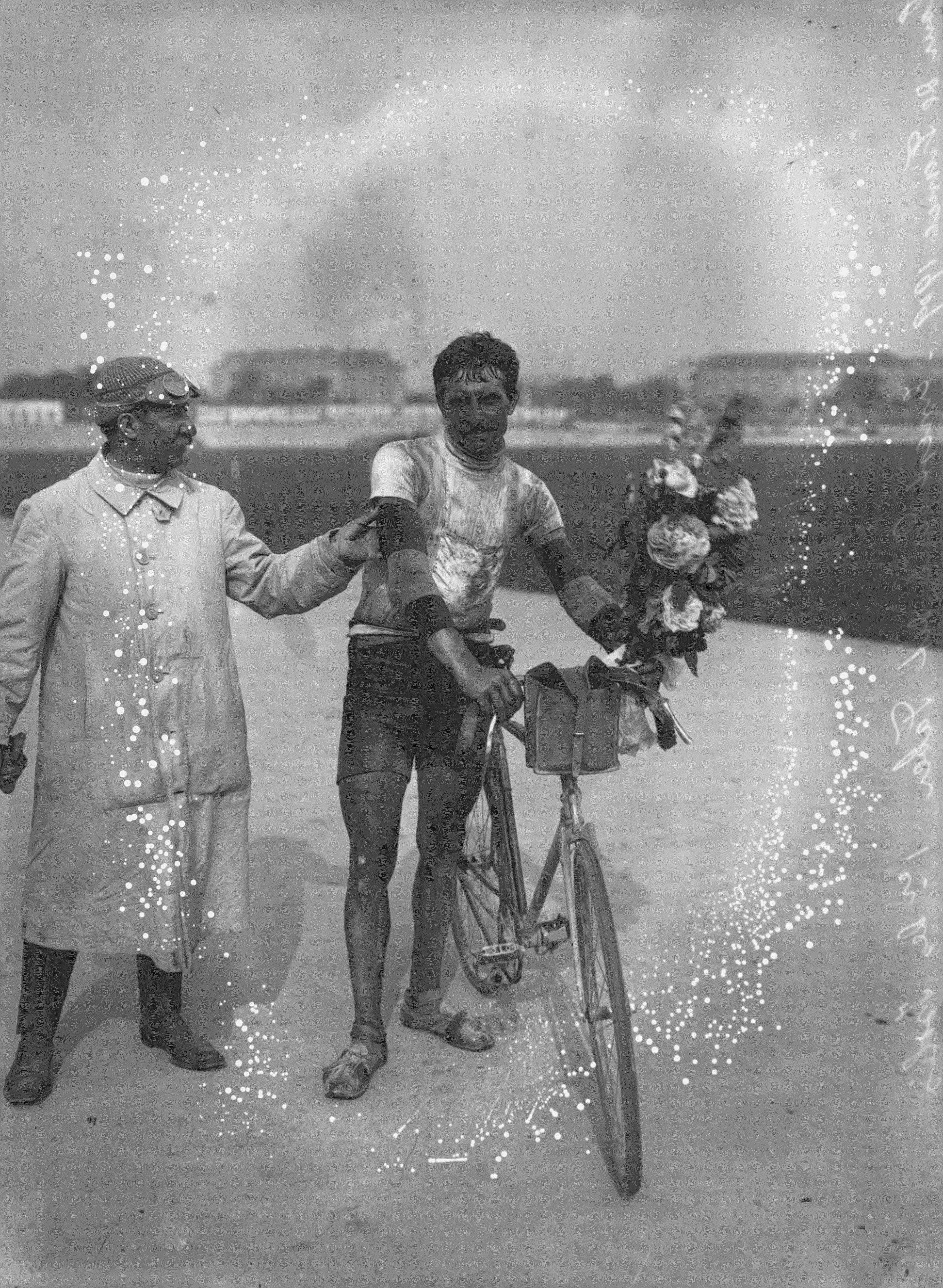

Personal information
- Full name: Ernest Paul
- Nickname: Ernest Faber
- Born: 5 December 1881 Villotte-sur-Ource, France
- Died: 9 September 1964 (aged 82) Saint-Gatien-des-Bois, France

Cycling career
- Sport: Cycling
- Discipline: Road
- Role: Rider

Major wins
- two stages Tour de France

Ernest Paul (5 December 1881 – 9 September 1964) was a French professional road bicycle racer.

Paul was born in Villotte-sur-Ource, and was a half-brother of Tour de France-winner François Faber. Ernest Paul rode the Tour de France seven times, finished six times, and won two stages. He finished in the top 10 three times, his best final classification was his sixth place in 1909. He died in Saint-Gatien-des-Bois, aged 82.

== Major results ==
1909
Tour de France:

Winner stage 7

1910
Tour de France:

Winner stage 11
