= Dan Albone =

English inventor (1860–1906)

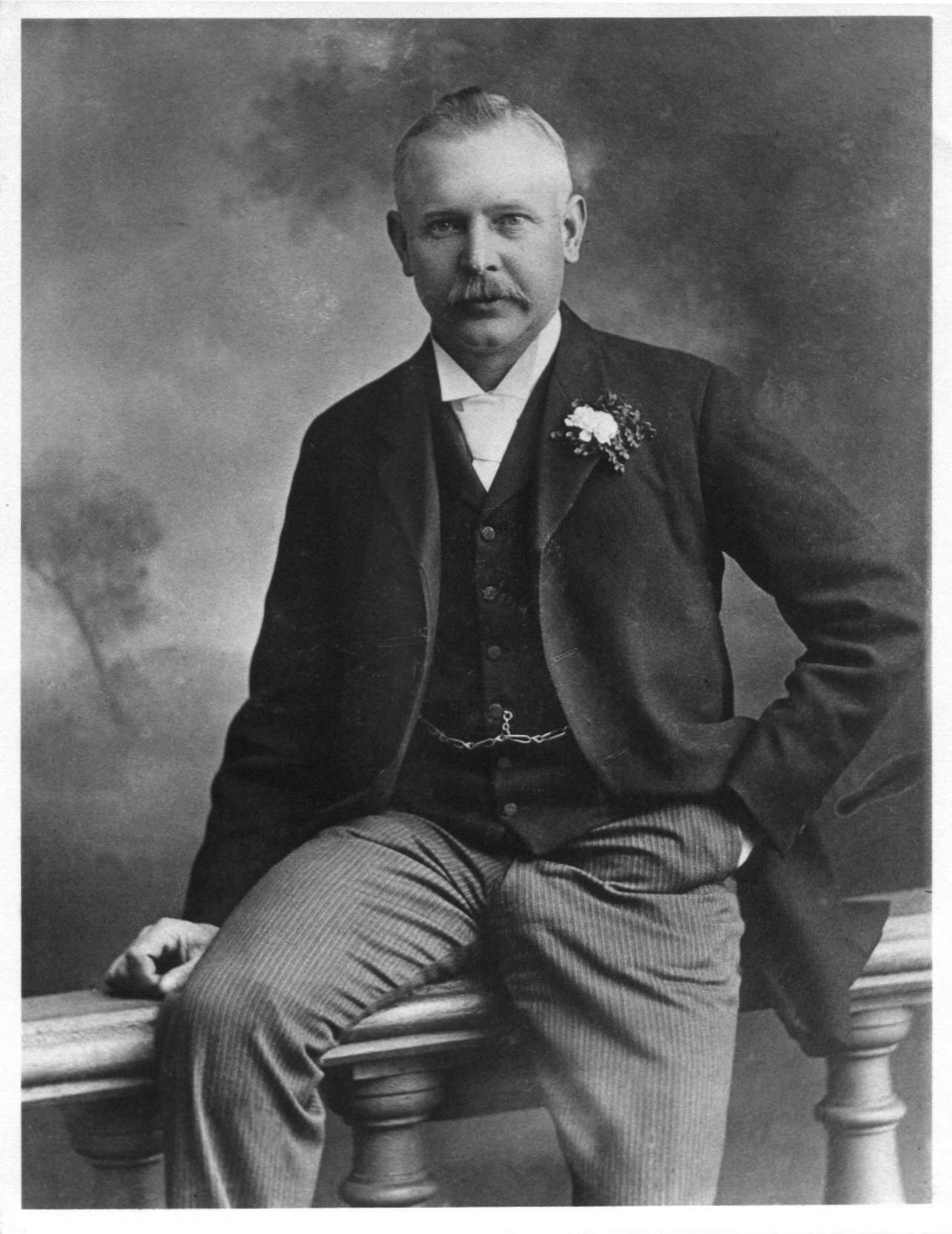
- Dan Albone in 1905
- Born: 12 September 1860; Biggleswade, Bedfordshire, England
- Died: 30 October 1906 (aged 46)
- Known for: Inventing the light farm tractor and the Ivel Safety bicycle.

Daniel Albone (12 September 1860 – 30 October 1906) was an English inventor, manufacturer and cyclist. He invented the first successful light farm tractor, and the Ivel Safety bicycle.

== Early life ==
Born 12 September 1860 at Biggleswade, Bedfordshire to Edward and Edith Albone. The youngest of eight children, they lived at the Ongley Arms inn, between the Great North Road and the River Ivel. For his ninth birthday he received a Boneshaker bicycle, and so began his long association with cycling. By the age of 13, he had designed and built his own bicycle, complete with suspension, and was winning local races. On leaving school, he undertook an apprenticeship with a Biggleswade firm of millwrights and engineers, Thomas Course & Son of Hitchin Street.

== Cyclist ==
Albone won over 180 cycling prizes, including winner of the:

- 1885 two mile open at Oundle, Northamptonshire.
- 1885 one mile open handicap at Crystal Palace, London.
- 1887 one mile open and two-mile open at Oundle, Northamptonshire.
- 1888 International Tricycle scratch race, Scheveningen, Netherlands.

In 1885 he was a founder member of the North Road Cycling Club, dedicated to cycle racing. It attracted other national cycling champions, such as George Pilkington Mills and Monty Holbein.

== Cycle manufacturer ==
At the age of 20 he founded the Ivel Cycle Works in the yard of the Ongley Arms, making bicycles for himself and his fellow sports cyclists. His first products were the Ivel Light Roadster and the Ivel Racer. In 1882 he introduced the Ivel Tricycle, and in 1884, in collaboration with Laurence Huber the Ivel Automatic Steerer tricycle.

In 1885 John Kemp Starley exhibited his Rover Safety bicycle at the Stanley show. Albone copied this idea, and combined it with the Hillman, Herbert and Cooper cross frame design to produce the Ivel Safety cycle, in April 1886. This became very popular with sports cyclists. On 5 October 1886 George Pilkington Mills, on an Ivel Safety, achieved a world record 24-hour distance of 294.5 miles (474.0 km).

Albone went on to invent a tandem safety bicycle with Arthur James Wilson, cycle pump clamps with Richard Tingey, and a child carrier accessory for his cycles. By 1893 a general downturn in the economy had put many cycle manufacturers out of business, and Albone put the Ivel Cycle Works into voluntary liquidation.

== Ball bearing wheels ==
In 1886 Albone applied his knowledge of low friction wheels to produce a strong, light weight pony trap. This had a steel axle with ball bearings, and bicycle type steel and rubber wheels. The result was smooth and fast, and the pony trap was popular. The axles were also sold separately, to the Great Northern Railway company.

== Motor manufacturer ==
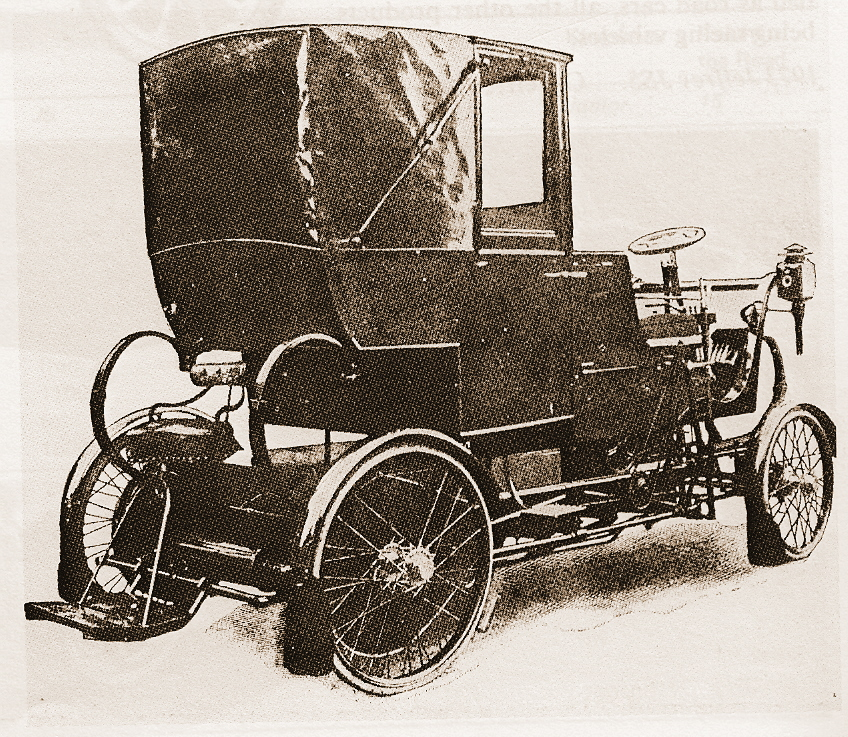
Ivel motor car, electric ignition independent suspension

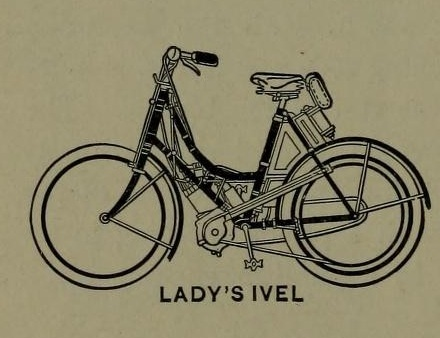
Ladies' Ivel motor bicycle

In the 1890s many cycle manufacturers moved into motor manufacture (for example William Morris and Armand Peugeot). Albone also developed a motor car, based on a 2.2 kW (3.0 hp) single cylinder Benz engine. He was driving a prototype around Bedfordshire in 1898, and exhibited it in London in 1900. A five seat version was developed, called the Ivel Landaulette, with a 6 kW (8.0 hp) twin cylinder engine.

A natural progression was the Ivel motor bicycle, in 1901. This was a strengthened bicycle, with a 1.1 kW (1.5 hp) engine driving the rear wheel.

== Tractor manufacturer ==
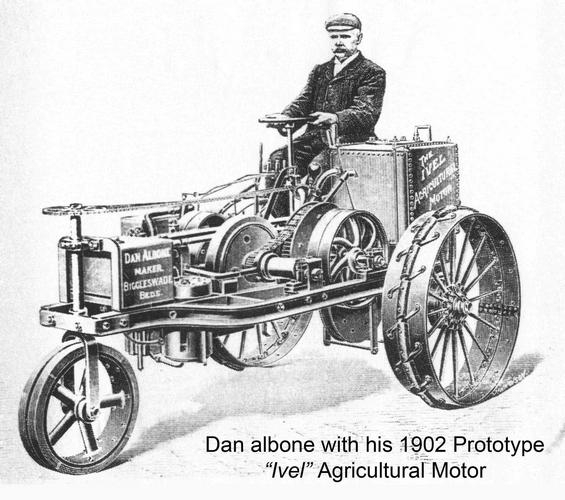
Dan Albone with his 1902 prototype Ivel Agricultural Motor

Ivel Agricultural Motor 1902
Power	6 kW (8.0 hp)
Weight	403 kg
Maximum load	2540 kg (2.5 tons)
Maximum speed	5 mph (8.0 km/h)
Engine size	2900 cc (177 cubic inches)
Cylinders	2
Stroke	4

During the late 19th century, power on farms was provided mainly by horses. Steam-powered portable engines and self-propelled traction engines had been introduced for agricultural work from about 1850, but the traction engines were too heavy for direct ploughing of the heavy soil found in Britain. In the 1890s, internal combustion engines started to become more common, but these were stationary engines for belt-driven agricultural machinery. An oil-powered traction engine had been developed, by Hornsby-Ackroyd in 1897, but like the steam-powered traction engines, this was very heavy at 8600 kg (8.5 tons).

Albone conceived a light-weight petrol-powered general purpose agricultural vehicle. By November 1901 he had completed his tractor design, and filed for a patent on 15 February 1902. On 12 December 1902 he formed Ivel Agricultural Motors Limited. The other directors were Selwyn Edge, Charles Jarrott, John Hewitt and Lord Willoughby. He called his machine the Ivel Agricultural Motor, the word 'tractor' did not come into common use until later.

Dan's "tractor" won silver medal at the Royal Agricultural Show, in 1903 and 1904; and in February 1904 an Ivel Agricultural Motor won a Gold Medal in the Chester Ploughing Match held at Waverton, this being the first occasion on which a competition of that kind had been open to mechanically propelled ploughs. About 500 were built, and many were exported all over the world. The original engine was made by Payne & Co. of Coventry. After 1906, French Aster engines were used. Over time it became heavier and more powerful, but it failed to keep pace with its rivals. The company declined after 1910, and in 1920 it went into receivership. The assets were bought by United Motor Industries Limited.

The Ivel Agricultural Motor was light, powerful and compact. It had one front wheel, with solid rubber tyre, and two large rear wheels like a modern tractor. The engine used water cooling, by evaporation. It had one forward and one reverse gear. A pulley wheel on the left hand side allowed it to be used as a stationary engine, driving a wide range of agricultural machinery. The 1903 sale price was £300.

== Family and sudden death ==
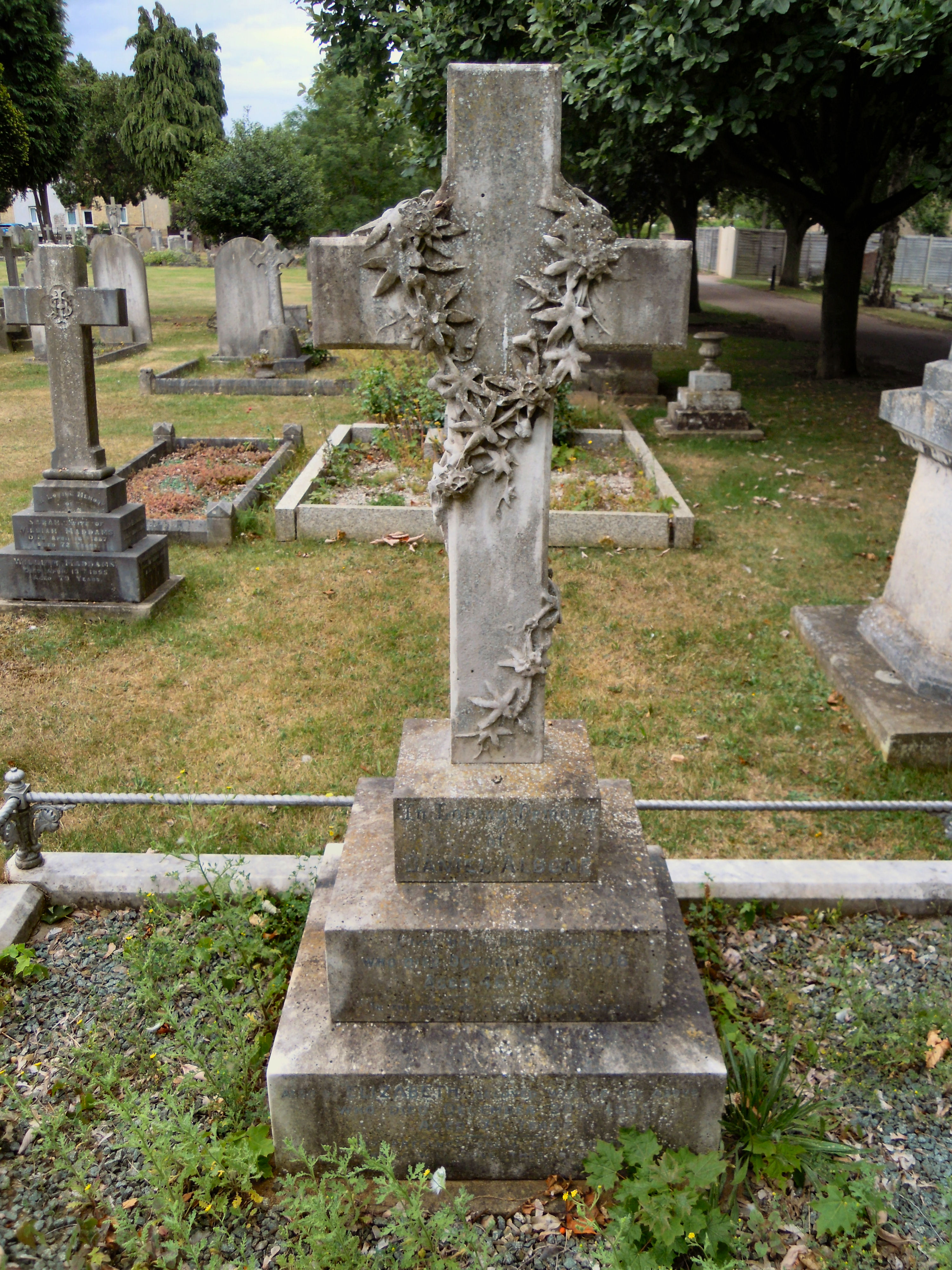
Albone's grave in Biggleswade Cemetery

Dan Albone married Elizabeth Martha Moulden in August 1887. They had two children. On 30 October 1906, while at work, Albone suffered a stroke and died. He was buried in Biggleswade Cemetery on 2 November.

== Memorials ==
- Albone Way, Biggleswade SG188BN.
- Dan Albone Memorial Picnic area, Biggleswade. Designated in 1980.
- Albone Glacier, Antarctic Peninsula (64°12′S 59°45′W). Designated in 1964 for pioneers of overland mechanical transport.

== See also ==
- List of former tractor manufacturers
