= Veloce =

Veloce may refer to:

- Veloce Ltd, defunct British motorcycle manufacturer commonly known as Velocette
- Veloce Publishing, British book publisher
- Veloce Racing, British motor racing team
- Véloce Sport, historic French cycling newspaper

== People with the surname ==
- Joseph Veloce (born 1989), Canadian cyclist

== See also ==
- Scuderia Veloce, historic Australian motor racing team
