= Frank Shorland =

English cyclist (1871–1929)

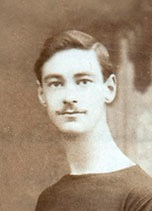
- Frank Shorland in 1892

Personal information
- Full name: Francis William Shorland
- Born: 29 September 1871 Orton, Northamptonshire, England
- Died: 14 October 1929 (aged 58) Northwood, County of London

Cycling career
- Sport: Cycling
- Disciplines: Road racing & Endurance
- Role: Rider

Amateur team
- North Road CC

Major wins
- Cuca Cocoa Cup 3 times (1891, 1892, 1893); North Road 24-hour time-trial 3 times (1892, 1893, 1894)

Francis William Shorland (29 September 1871 – 14 October 1929) was one of the dominant English racing cyclists of his generation, and triple winner of the prestigious 24-hours race for the Cuca Cocoa Cup that was disputed at the Herne Hill Velodrome. He was a member of the North Road cycling club.

== Cycling career ==
Shorland joined the North Road Club in London in August 1889 and would remain a member until his death in 1929. As a member of the club he would win the first three editions of its prestigious 24-hours race on the Great North Road. Having established himself as one of the top racing cyclists of the moment and he would confirm that status by winning the first three editions (from 1892 to 1894) of the 24 hours race at the newly created Herne Hill cycling track. As the race was sponsored by the Cuca Cocoa company, it became better-known as the Cuca Cocoa Cup.

== Road Records ==
During his racing career Shorland was also a successful record breaker, and on different occasions he held the 12 and 24 hour bicycle records, London to Brighton and back record, the London to Newcastle record (bicycle) and the London to York record (bicycle and on a tandem with Monty Holbein).

== Professional life ==
After his cycling career Shorland stayed connected to the bicycle and the emerging automobile industry. In 1909 he became the chairman and general manager of the Clément-Talbot automobile company.
