= Kangaroo bicycle =

1880s alternative to high-wheeler bicycle

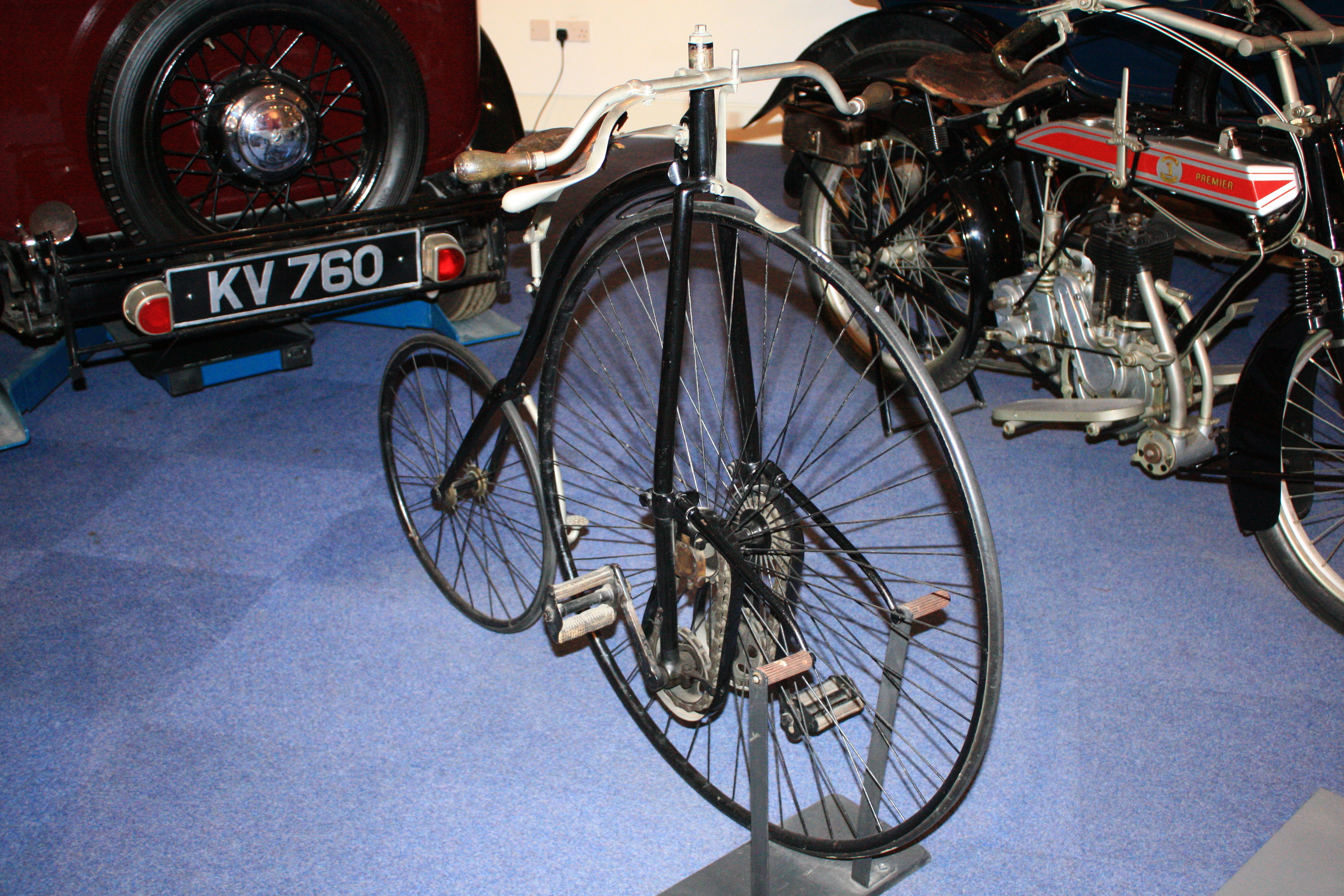
1884 Kangaroo dwarf safety bicycle at the Coventry Transport Museum

The Kangaroo dwarf bicycle was created in 1884 by Hillman, Herbert, and Cooper as a safer alternative to the ordinary bicycle. It had a 36-inch front drive wheel that was geared up to be equivalent to a 60 inch ordinary bicycle with a pair of chain drives, one on each side of the wheel. The Kangaroo was soon superseded by the Rover and other, more-modern safety bicycles.
