= Le Véloce-sport =

Le Véloce-sport, edition 1, Thursday, March 5, 1885

Le Véloce-sport was a leading French cycling periodical that was founded in Bordeaux in 1885. It was the organiser and publicist of the first running of the Bordeaux–Paris cycle race in 1891.

== Bicycle touring ==
The Véloce-sport quickly published various guides for bicycle touring. One can read for example in 1889 a guide for a tour between Aude and Pyrénées-Orientales in southern France, from Quillan to Caudiès-de-Fenouillèdes. Even though the landscape is said to be quite picturesque, it is also very often specified that the bad state of the roads makes it compulsory, at the time, to frequently go by feet rather than on the bike.

== Bordeaux-Paris ==
In 1890 Le Véloce-sport and the Velo Club Bordelais announced that a cycle race from would start in Bordeaux on May 23, 1891, and finish in Paris after covering 572 kilometres. It was to be the first inter-city race to feature the safety bicycle. A crowd of 7,000 Parisians gathered at the finish at Port Maillot, near the Vélodrome Buffalo.

The organisers envisaged riders might take several days and laid on meals and beds for riders along the way, but George Pilkington Mills rode through the night and finished first in finished in 26 hours on a diet that included a lot of strawberries. British riders took the first four places.
