= Biggleswade Cemetery =

Cemetery in Bedfordshire, England

Coordinates: 52.0897°N 0.2538°W

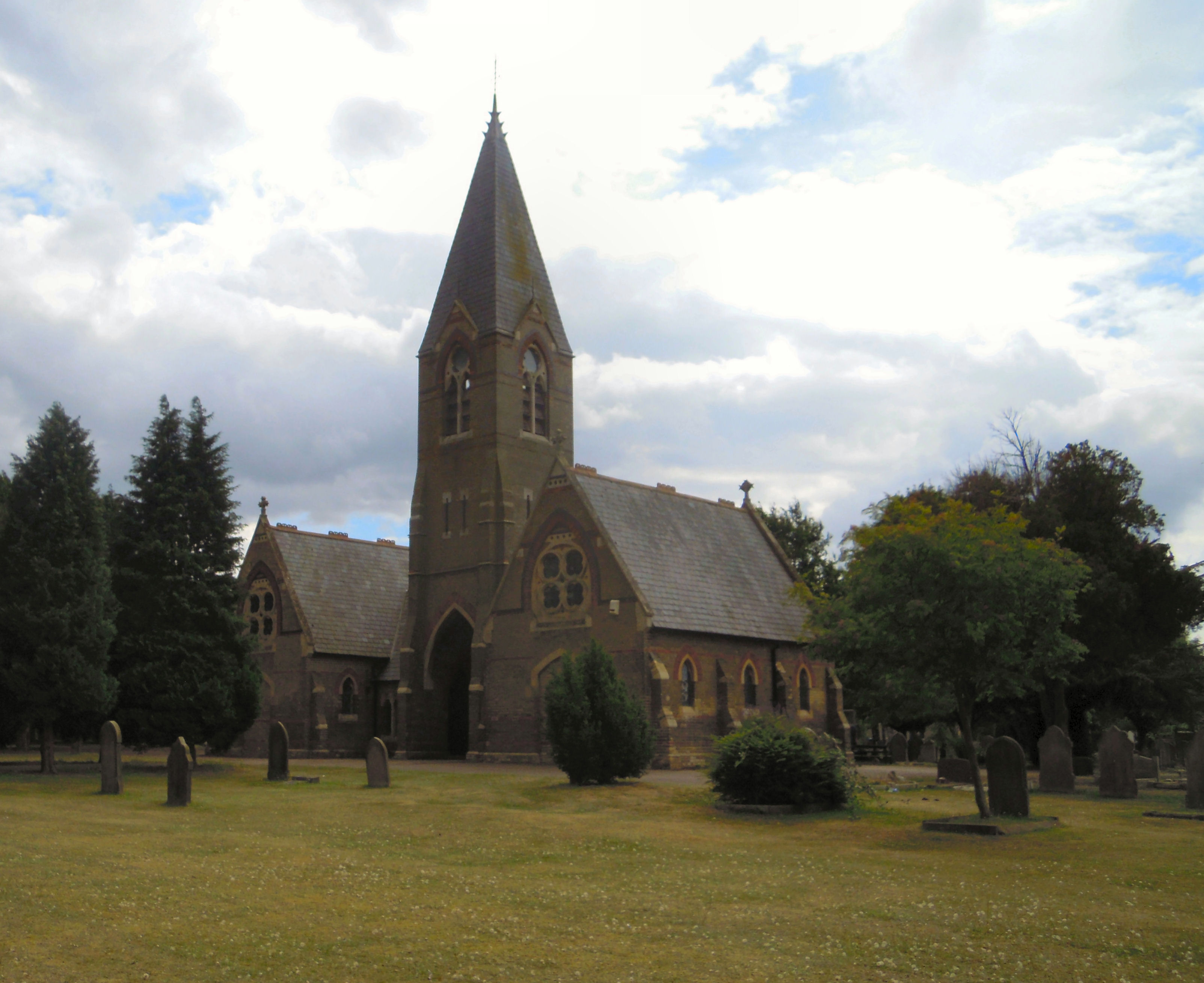
The Chapel at Biggleswade Cemetery

Biggleswade Cemetery (also known as Drove Road Cemetery) was the main burial ground for the town of Biggleswade in Bedfordshire. Opening in 1869, the cemetery is located on Drove Road and since 1986 has been closed for burials except for interment in family plots.

== Origins ==
As a result of two cholera epidemics in England during the 19th century a large number of public cemeteries were created across the country during the 1850s and 1860s. Biggleswade founded a Burial Board in 1867 and two acres on the east of the town were purchased for the new cemetery at a cost of £1,500. The first burial in the Drove Road Cemetery was in 1869, when St Andrew's churchyard in the town centre was closed, and the last was in 1986.

== The Chapel ==
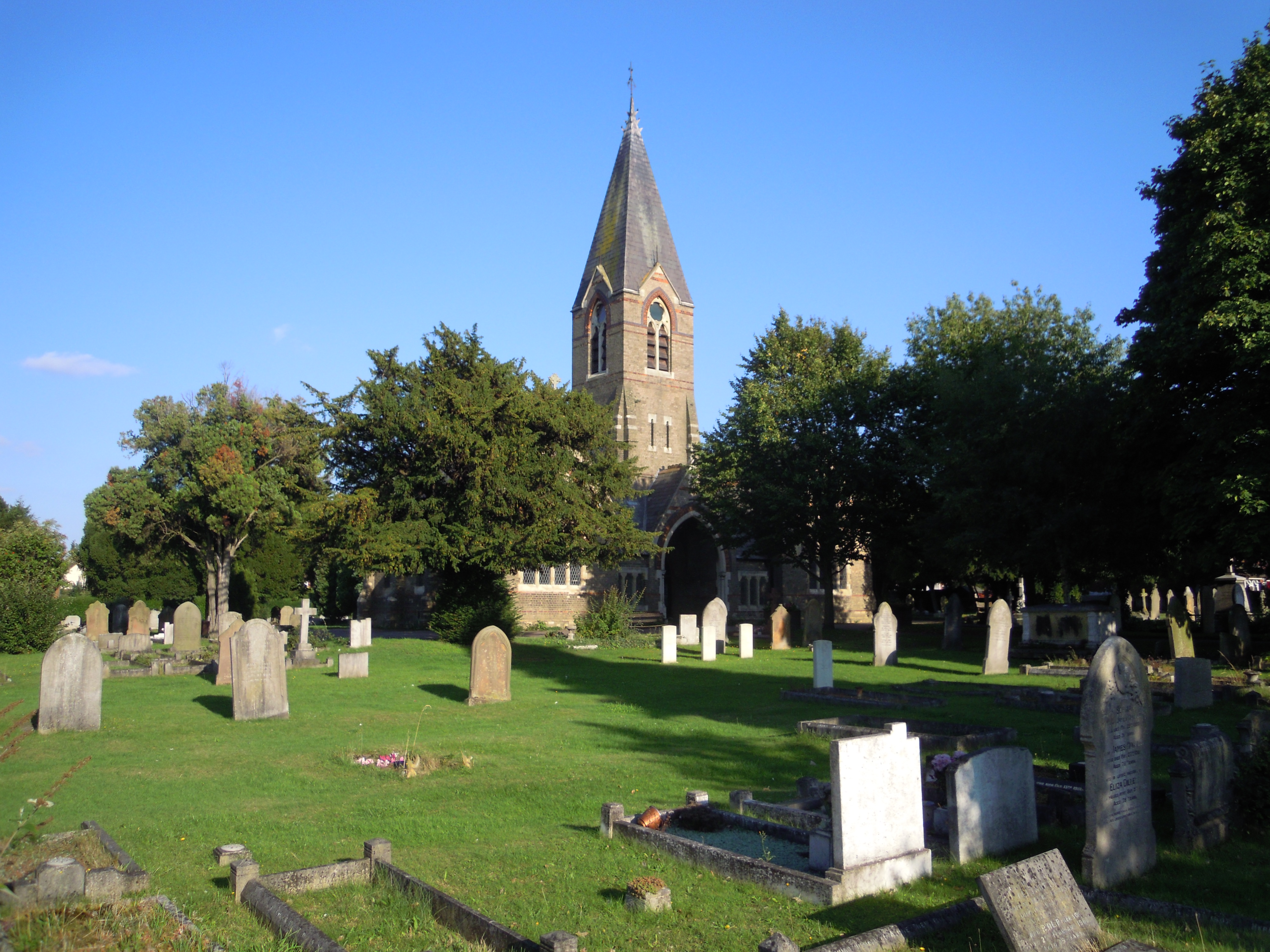
The Chapel

Centrally located within the cemetery is the Chapel, which was built in 1867 and is in the Gothic Revival style. It was designed by architects Ladds & Hooker of London and the building work was carried out by local builder Edward Twelvetrees, who is buried in the cemetery with his wife. The central spire is 90 feet tall and houses a single 2cwt bell cast by John Warner & Sons (who cast the original Big Ben for the Palace of Westminster) at their Crescent Foundry in London. The Chapel has two small chapels either side of the base of the spire - one for the Church of England and the other for Nonconformists; these have been little used in recent years. The Chapel has undergone significant restoration works during late 2012 and early 2013.

Nineteen war casualties are buried in Drove Road Cemetery, seventeen from World War I and two from World War II. Thirteen of these have standard Commonwealth War Graves Commission headstones while the other six are in family graves. The cemetery was originally managed by the Biggleswade Urban District Council; today it is managed by Biggleswade Town Council.

== Notable burials ==
- Dan Albone, English inventor, manufacturer and cyclist

== Gallery ==
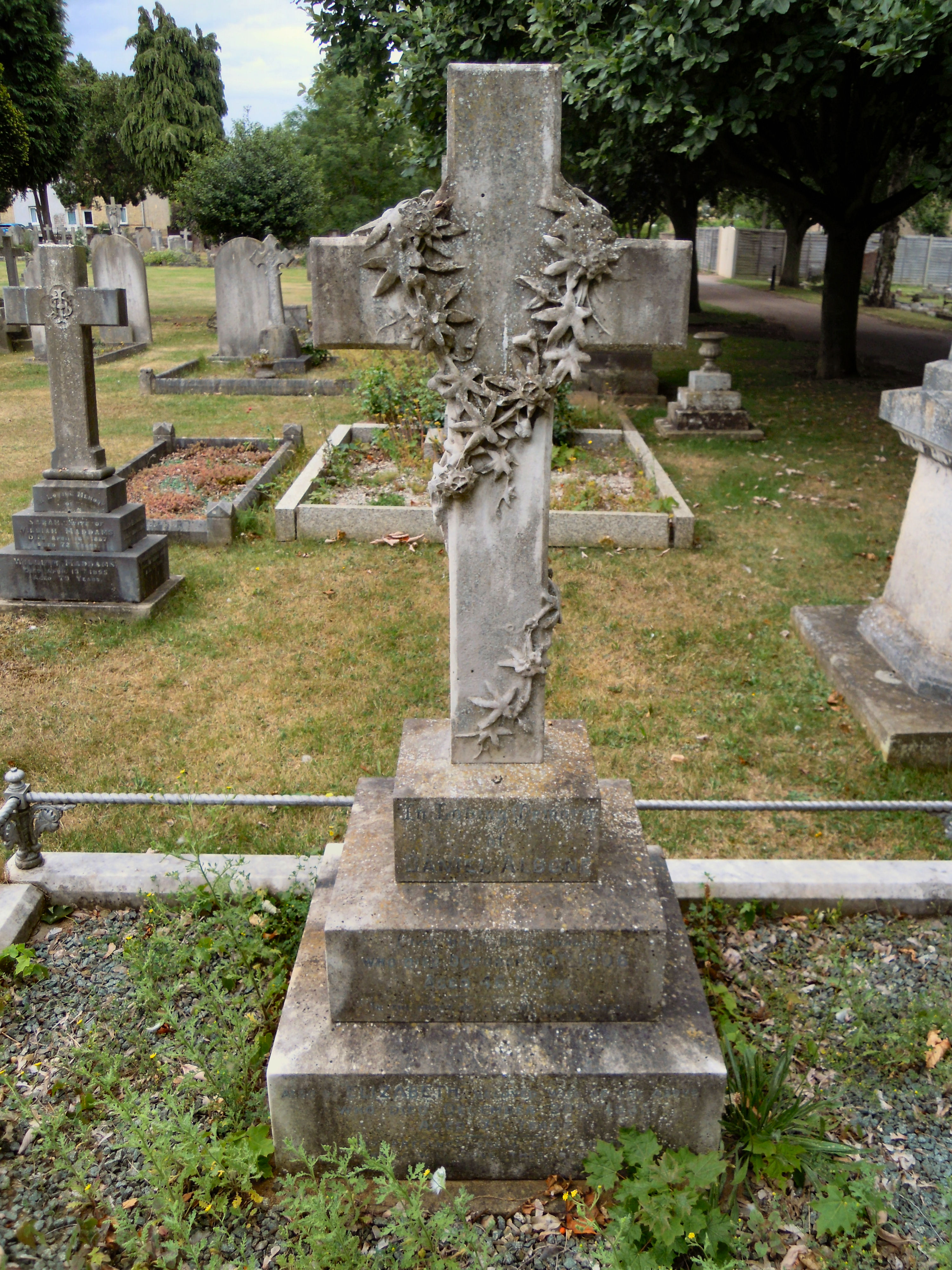
The grave of Dan Albone

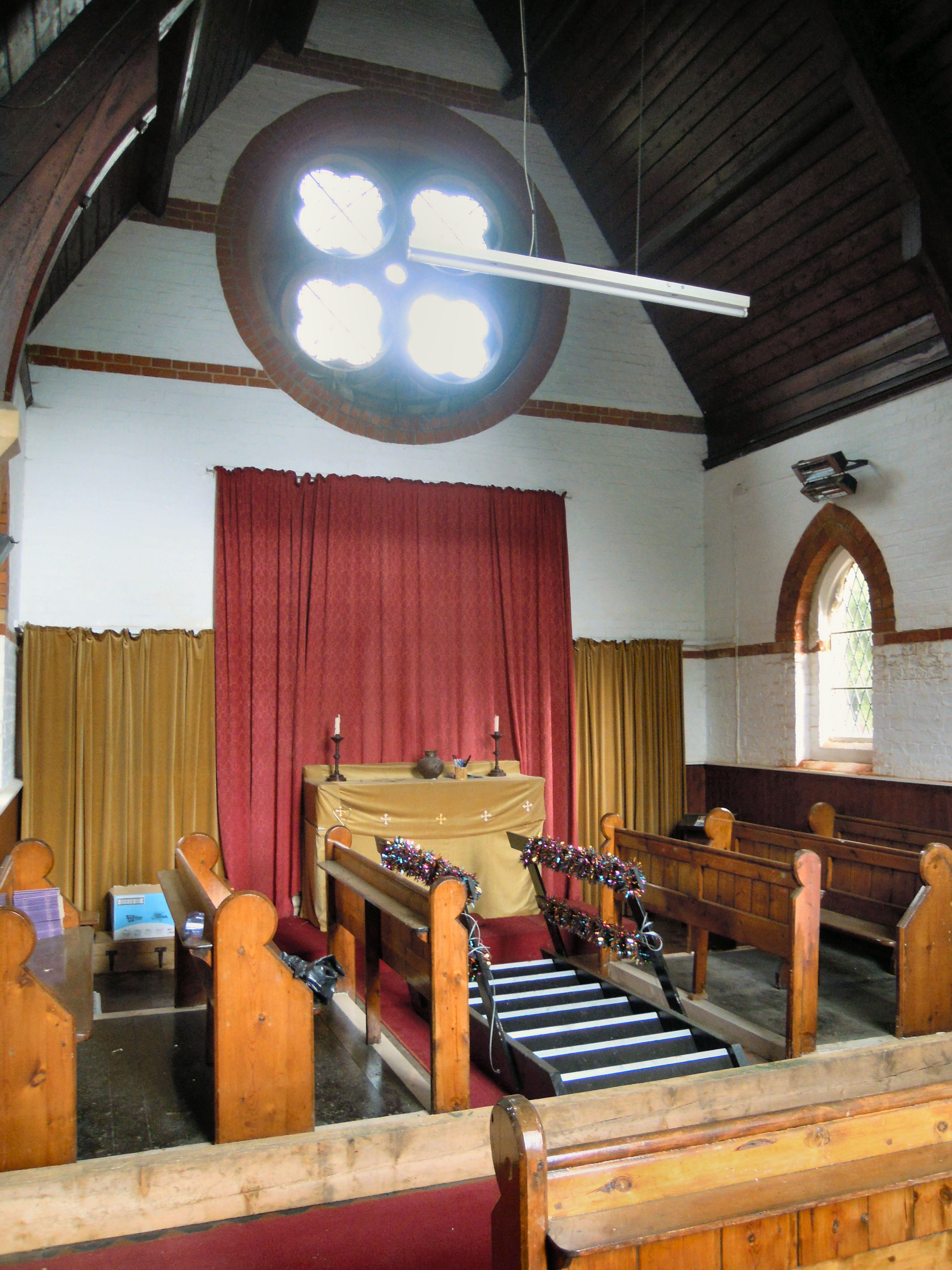
Interior of a chapel at Biggleswade Cemetery

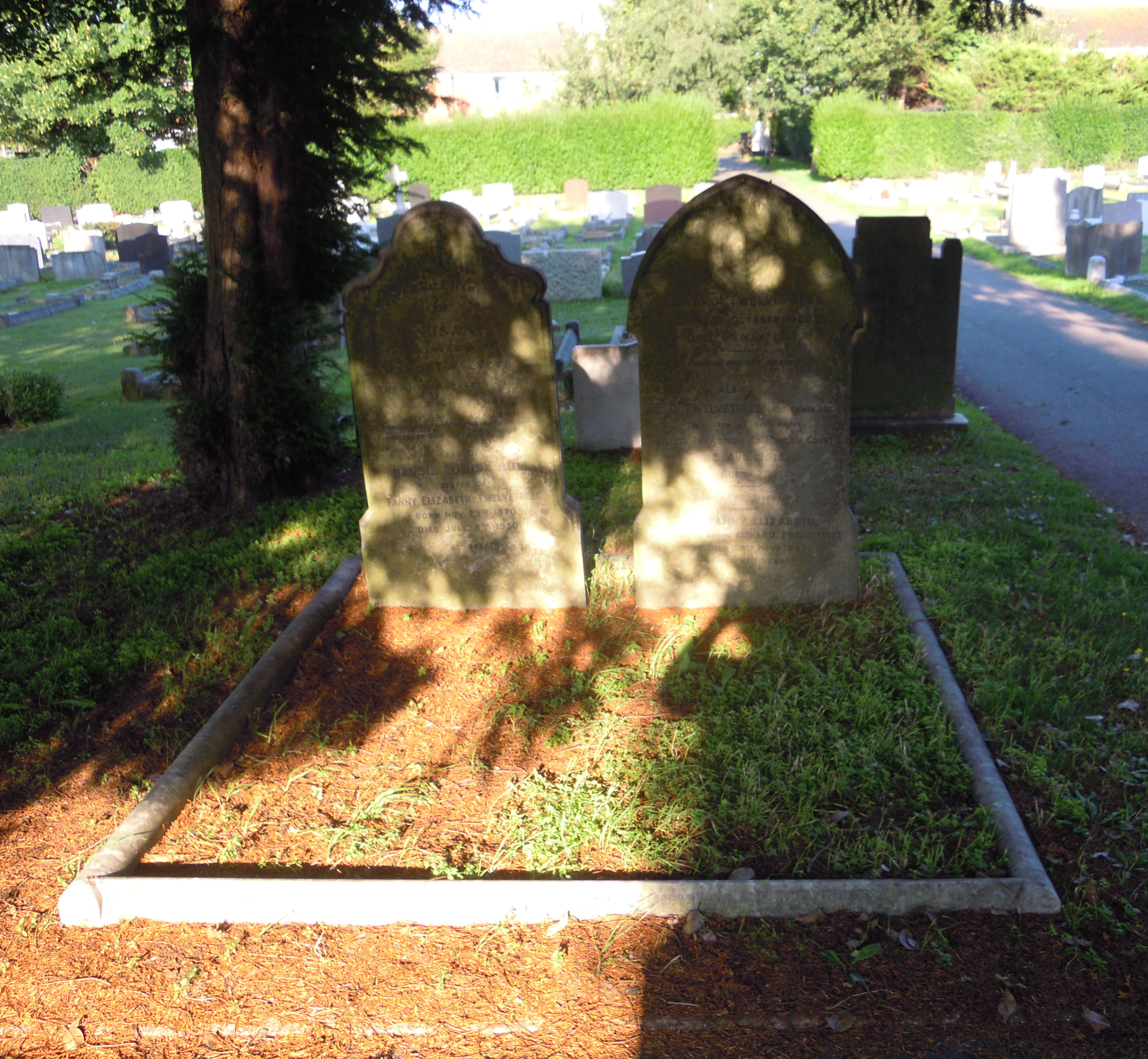
The graves of Edward Twelvetrees (who built the chapel) and his wife

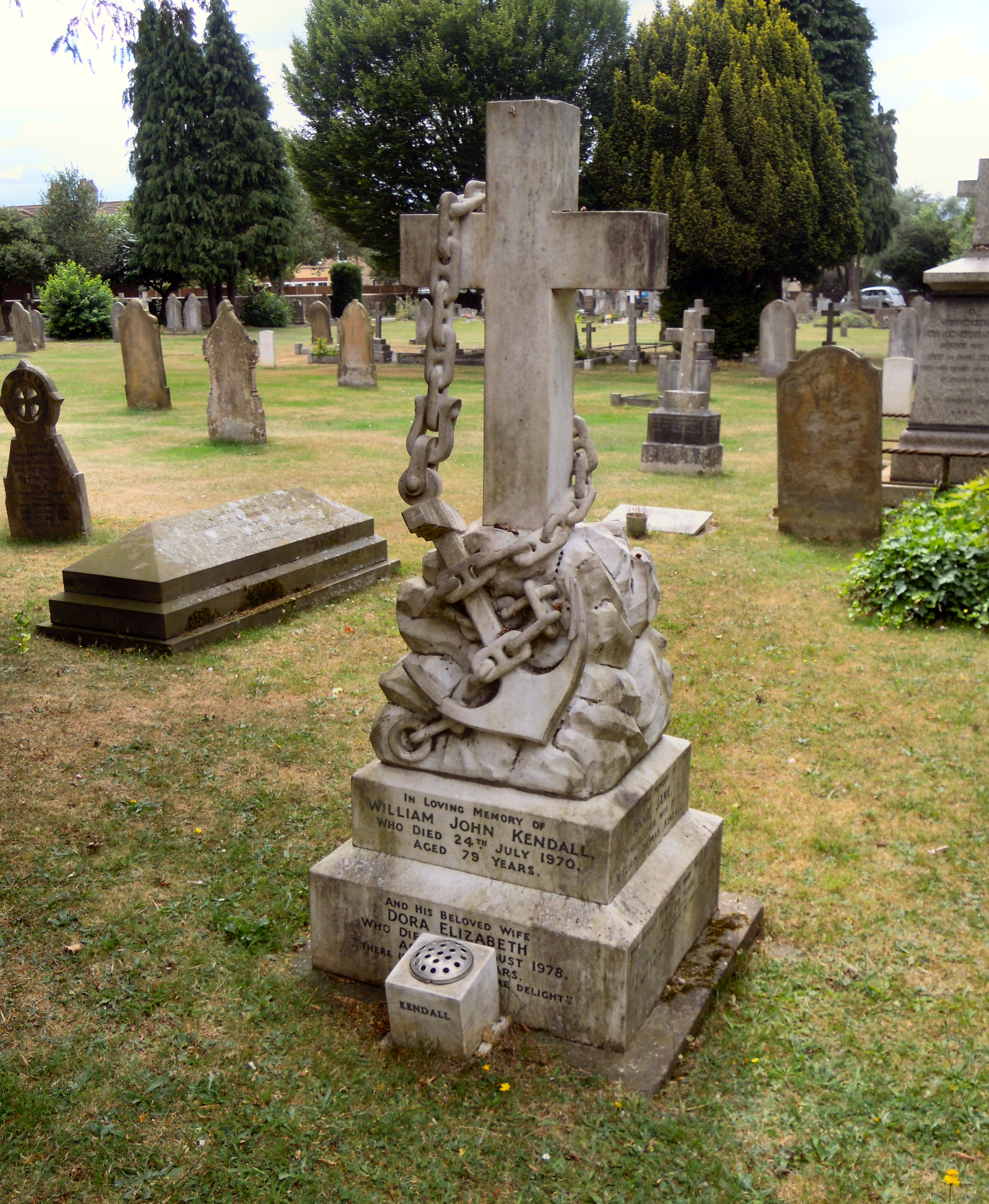
A distinctive nautical headstone in the cemetery

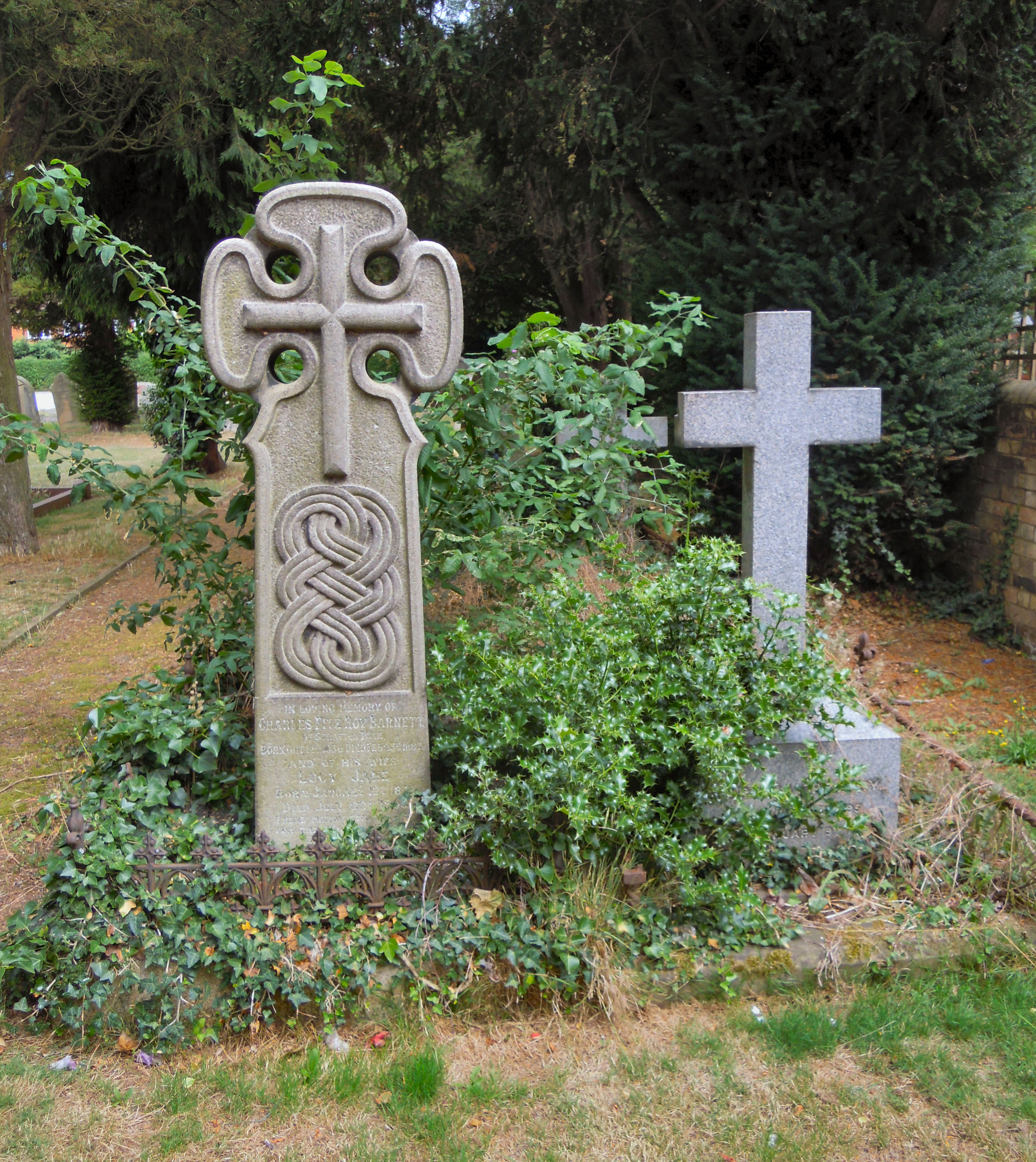
Headstones in the cemetery
