= John McCammon =

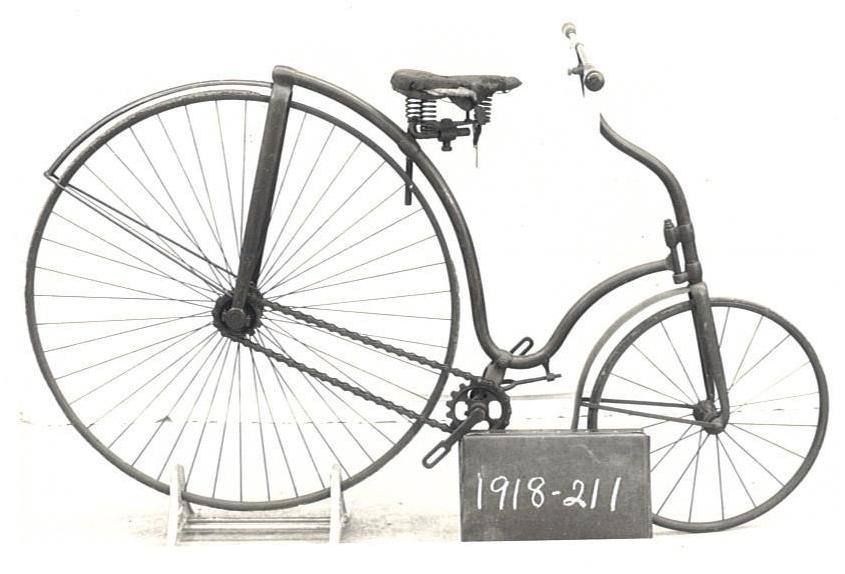
An 1884 McCammon safety bicycle.

John McCammon, of Belfast, developed an early safety bicycle in 1884. It had a step-through frame.
