= George Pilkington Mills =

English cyclist

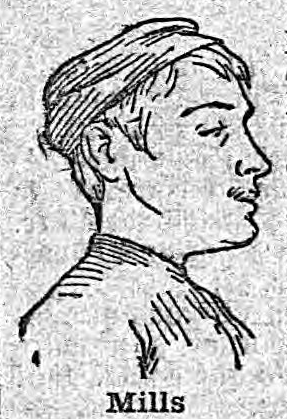

Personal information
- Full name: George Pilkington Mills
- Born: 8 January 1867 Paddington, Middlesex
- Died: 8 November 1945 (aged 78) Westminster, County of London

Cycling career
- Sport: Cycling
- Disciplines: Road racing & Endurance
- Role: Rider

Amateur teams
- Anfield CC
- North Road CC

Major wins
- Land's End-John o' Groats record 6 times 1886–1895; North Road 24-hour time-trial (penny-farthing); Tandem-tricycle record for 50 miles

George Pilkington Mills DSO (8 January 1867 – 8 November 1945) was the dominant English racing cyclist of his generation, and winner of the inaugural Bordeaux–Paris cycle race. He frequently rode from Land's End to John o' Groats, holding the world record time on six occasions between 1886 and 1895. He was a member of the Anfield and North Road cycling clubs. He later won races and broke records as a car racer and motorcycle rider.

== Land's End-John o'Groats ==
The record from one end of Britain to the other is the longest place-to-place challenge recognised by the Road Records Association. Riders choose their own route but the distance then, before ferries shortened it, was about 900 miles. The first record was set by James Lennox of Dumfries, who took six days and 16 hours in 1885 while being paced by tandems. One of the pacers was George Paterson, who also rode a penny-farthing. He would pace Lennox from Carlisle to Lockerbie. The following year, Mills, who was 18, broke the record twice, once on a large-wheeled penny-farthing bicycle and once on a tricycle. He rode the bicycle in five days, 1 hour 45 minutes, the tricycle in 5 days 10 hours, an improvement of 29 1/2 hours. The journalist and official Frederick Thomas Bidlake said:

The sensation was not that he was merely one of a sequence of record breakers, but that he knocked more than a day off each of the previous bests, in a sort of double event, riding virtually without sleep, certainly no more than a wayside nod.

Mills' penny-farthing record stood until July 2019, when it was beaten by Richard Thoday in 4 days 11hrs and 52 mins. Mills was helped by other members of the Anfield Bicycle Club, who organised accommodation and food, and enrolled other cyclists to guide him.

== Other timed races ==
In the summer Mills broke the Land's End-John o'Groats record, he also won the North Road 24-hour time-trial on a penny-farthing with 288 miles, set records on a bicycle for 50 miles and 24 hours (259 miles) and set a tandem-tricycle record for 50 miles.

In 1887, he won the North Road 24-hour on a tricycle. He rode 298 1/2 miles on a tandem with R. Tingley in the same year. In 1888 he improved the 100-mile tricycle record with 6h 58m 54s and the 50-mile record with 2h 53m 42s.

His obituary in The Bicycle said: "He was a pioneer long-distance record breaker, and had the distinction of competing in three 24-hour events in one week, and between the years 1885 and 1895 broke no fewer than 19 national records."

== Bordeaux–Paris ==
George Mills won the inaugural Bordeaux–Paris race in 1891. He was invited by the organisers, the newspaper Véloce Sport because of his reputation in an age when long-distance racing was the fashion. A race from Bordeaux in the south-west to the capital in Paris would be the longest annual event in France.

The race started at 5 am in the Place du Pont Bastide in Bordeaux. There were 38 riders. As well as the British – Mills, Monty Holbein, Selwyn Francis Edge and Joah Edward Lionel Bates – there were a Pole and a Swiss. The British riders had woollen jerseys and leggings and their bicycles had footrests on the forks to profit from descents. The French were less organised and had trousers strapped closed at the ankle.

Mills fell on bad roads after 10 km when he touched with the French favourite, Jiel-Laval, but neither was hurt. The English group moved to the front when the field began to straggle after the first hour. They led by a mile at dawn after averaging 14 mph. The historian Victor M. Head write: "At 10.30 Angoulème was reached and the Englishmen stopped to gulp down bowls of hot soup. When they restarted, Mills began to make all the running, drawing steadily away from his companions until, arriving at Ruffeo, he was half an hour in the lead."

The rapid departure surprised the organisers. A report said:

Everything had been prepared to receive the riders properly [recevoir dignement]: full meals, baths, hot showers, nothing was forgotten, and there were good beds to welcome our heroes, because there was no doubt among the excellent people of Angoulème that it was impossible to ride 127km on a bicycle without immediately needing several hours' rest. To the great stupefaction of the spectators, not one of the riders took advantage of what had been provided. The eventual winner, G.P. Mills, stopped for several moments at best. He had a plan: he let Holbein eat peacefully at the control because he knew that a real champion, Lewis Stroud, was waiting to show him the way out of town and that, with him as a precious, fast and durable pacer he could build up the lead he needed to win the race.

Mills reached Tours after 215 miles and more than 12 hours on the road. He rested for five minutes, ate raw meat "and a specially prepared stimulant", and set off an hour ahead of the other British riders. "By now," said Head, "the Frenchmen were hopelessly out of the running." He wrote:

Although the judges, the officials, and the large crowd had been waiting impatiently for three hours before the winner's weary, mud-caked figure was seen coming along the boulevard de la Porte Maillot, his reception was "wildly enthusiastic", as one writer put it, and he was escorted in triumph to his hotel. The time of 26h 36m 25s was truly remarkable when one considers the appalling road conditions, poor weather, and the delays, and all the other hardships encountered. The British victory was complete. Monty Holbein (27h 52m 15s) came in second, with Edge, nearly three hours away, third, and Bates fourth.

The crowd at the finish was put at 7,000.

The first Frenchman – Jiel-Laval – was fifth, five and a half hours behind Mills. Riders were still coming in two days later.

The Bicycle Union – later renamed the National Cyclists Union – had strict views about amateurism and had demanded its French equivalent ensure that all taking part met its own amateur ideals. Only then would the NCU allow Mills and other British amateurs to take part, although it accepted that professionals such as Charles Terront could be employed as pacers. When Mills won, the Bicycle Union realised he was the works manager at a bicycle factory and decided he should be asked "whether he paid the whole of his expenses in the above-mentioned race." Only when he could prove that he had would the Bicycle Union concede that he was not a professional.

== Cycling club life ==
Mills joined the Anfield Bicycle Club, in Liverpool 1884, five years after it was formed. He was a founding member of the North Road Club in London. At his death on 8 November 1945, he was one of only two founding members still alive. The other was E. P. Moorehouse. With Mills dead and Moorehouse ill, the club cancelled presentations to mark their achievements and their long association.

== Military service ==
Mills joined the army in 1889 and retired in 1906 as a major. He volunteered again in 1914 and in March 1915 was stationed at Colchester. He was a captain in the Bedfordshire regiment. He left for France in December 1915 and by 1917 had been promoted to lieutenant-colonel. He was awarded the Distinguished Service Order and he was mentioned in dispatches three times.

He became director of the small arms and machine gun department of the Ministry of Munitions after 1918. He joined the Home Guard in the second world war.

== Civilian life ==
Mills moved several times for work. He worked at Beeston, Nottinghamshire, home of the Humber Cycle company. Raleigh employed him to run operations at its new factory when it opened in Lenton, Nottingham, in 1896. There he introduced automation and, in Raleigh's words, "other American practices." He moved in 1910 to west London to join the motor manufacturer Clément-Talbot. It was from there that he joined the army. He worked for the Aster Engineering Company in Wembley after the war, then in 1924 at Belsize Motor Company in Manchester.

=== Car and motorcycle racing ===
In 1907 he won the TT Race for international heavy touring cars in a 30 hp Beeston Humber. An undated news cutting says he also beat a motorcycling record. It says: "Mr G.P. Mills on his Raleigh motorcycle completed his run from Land's End to John o'Groats on Saturday forenoon and established a new record. He started on his long and trying journey at eight on Thursday morning, and arrived at his destination at 11am on Saturday, after being 50h 46m 30s on the road. Mr F.T. Bidlake was the timekeeper. Mr J. Silver previously held the record, having done the distance in 64h 29m, and Mr E.H. Arnott in 65h 45m. He has not only beaten the motor cycle record, but is also nearly two hours ahead of best motor car time."

=== Personal life ===
Mills was an excellent shot, and carried a Colt revolver while training to fend off dogs. He shot five of them.

In 1929 he lived in Bathampton, near Bath, then in 1932 at Malvern, in 1935 in Bournemouth From 1938 until he died he lived at Shirley, in Surrey. He died in Westminster Hospital, London, followed by a funeral at Shirley parish church, Shirley, Croydon.
