= Safety bicycle =

1880s pedal-driven vehicle

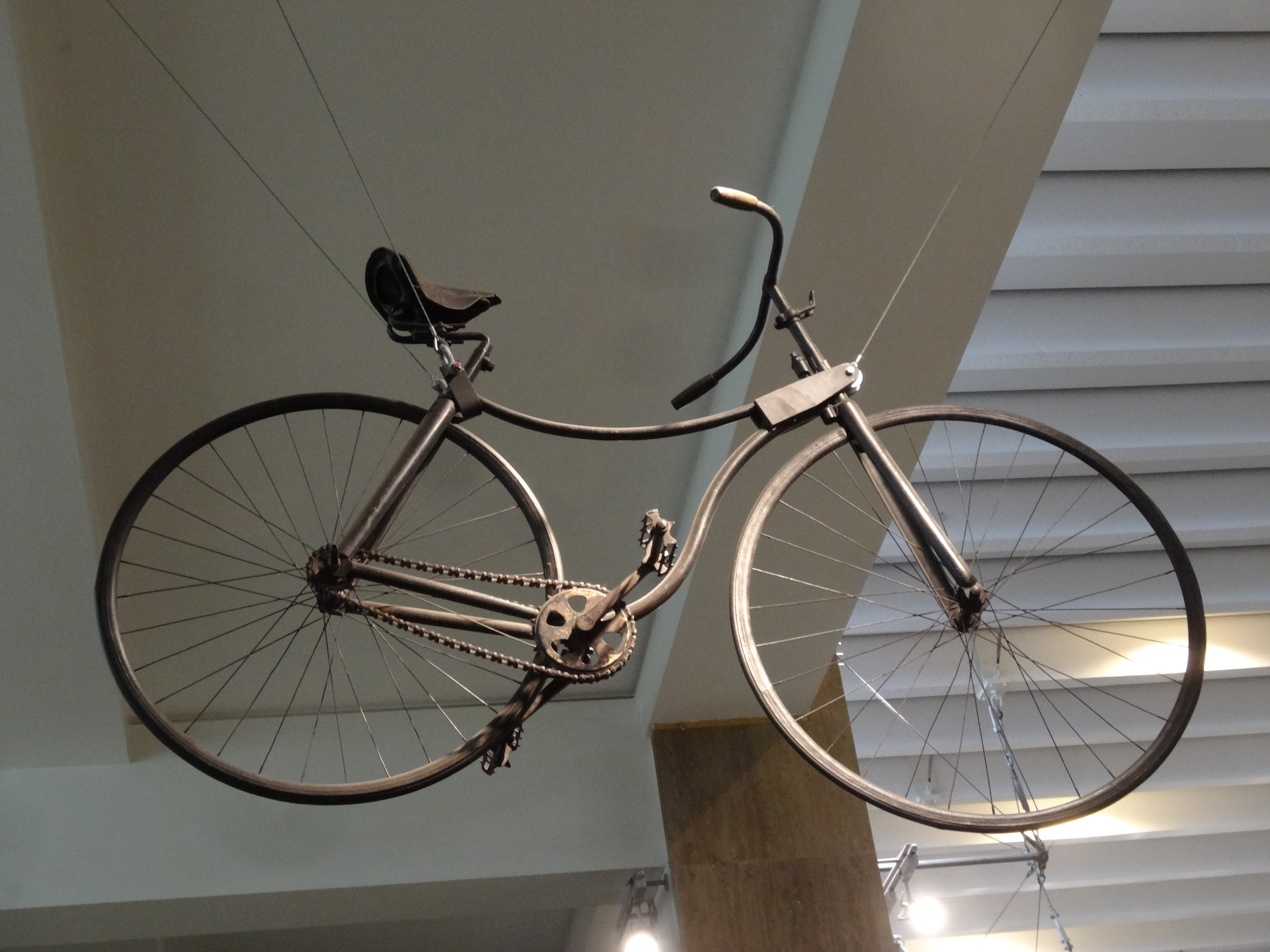
An 1885 Rover safety bicycle in the London Science Museum

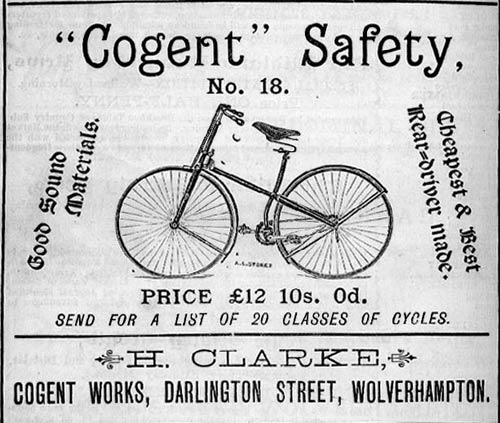
1887 advertisement for a safety bicycle, Wolverhampton, England

A safety bicycle (or simply a safety) is a type of bicycle that became very popular in the late 1880s as an alternative to the penny-farthing (also known as an "ordinary" or "high wheeler") and is now the most common type of bicycle. Early bicycles of this style were known as safety bicycles, because they were safer than the high wheelers they were replacing. Even though modern bicycles use a similar design, the term is rarely used today and is considered obsolete outside circles familiar with high wheelers.

== Definition ==
The term 'safety bicycle' was used in the 1880s for any alternative to the penny-farthing. The front and rear wheel were not necessarily the same size. Later historians began to use the term in a more restricted way for the design that was a direct ancestor to most modern bicycles.

"Diamond frame" is also sometimes used as a term for safety bicycles, even though this technically only refers to a certain type of safety bicycle. The retronyms "upright bicycle" or "vertical bicycle" are used to distinguish the style from recumbent bicycles.

== History ==
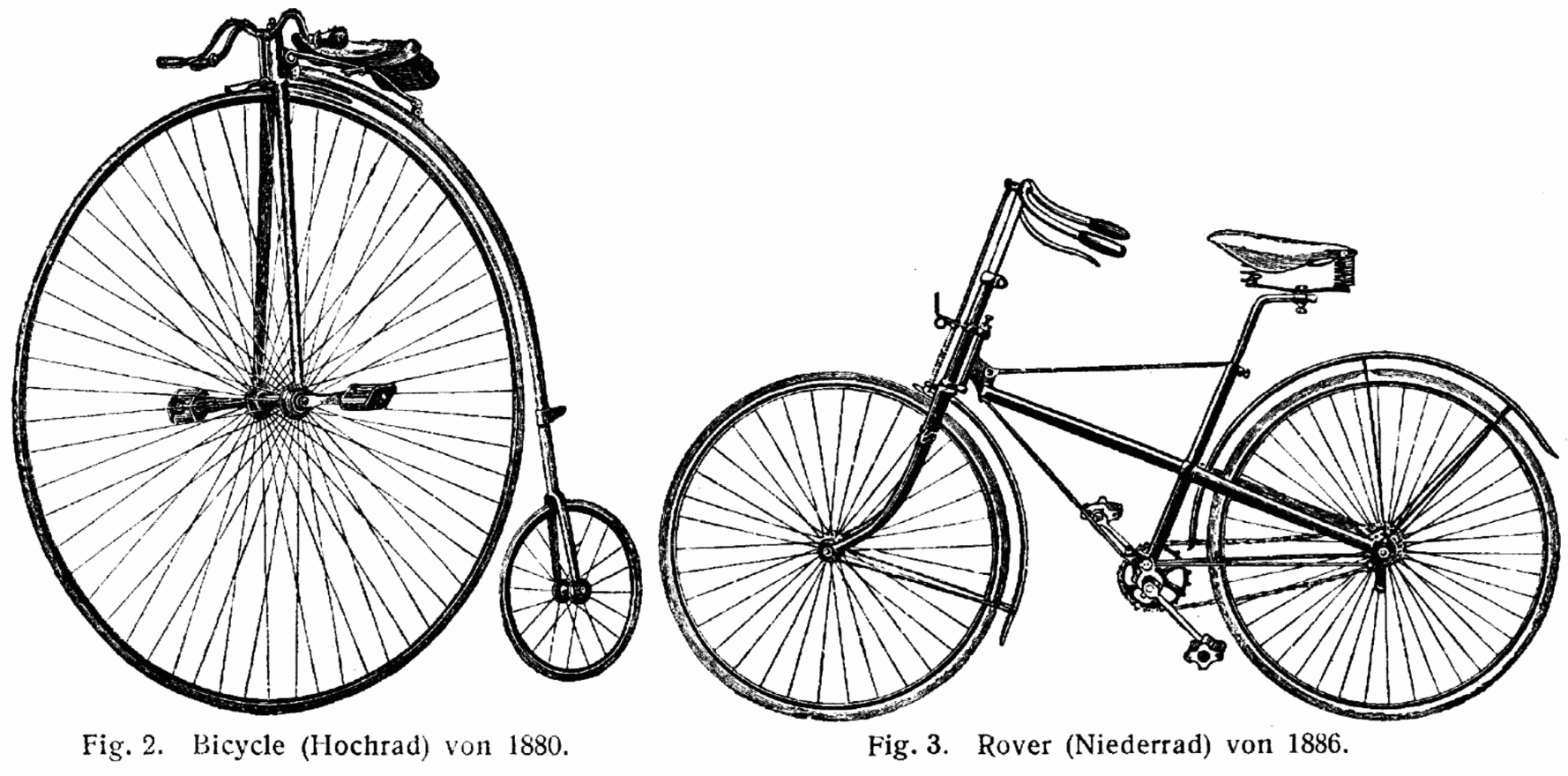
An 1880 penny-farthing (left), and a 1886 Rover safety bicycle (right)

The first bicycle to be called a "safety" was designed by the English engineer Henry ("Harry") Lawson in 1876, although other bicycles which fit the description had been developed earlier, such as by Thomas Humber in 1868. Unlike with penny-farthings, the rider's feet were within reach of the ground, making it easier to stop. The pedals powered the rear wheel, keeping the rider's feet safely away from the front wheel.

The original treadle bicycle model used treadles to transfer power to the rear wheel. The 1879 model used a chain drive, an important new technology that had previously only been used on tricycles. Lawson's safety failed to catch on, perhaps because of its increased cost, weight and complexity compared to the penny-farthing. One other variation that appeared at about the same time is the dwarf, exemplified by the Kangaroo, and with a chain-driven front wheel.

In 1885, the safety bicycles cataloged in Henry Sturmey's Indispensable Handbook to the Safety Bicycle included 7 with lever front-drives, 44 with geared front-drives, and only 9 with chain rear-drives. In that same year, John Kemp Starley (J. K. Starley) came out with the first commercially successful safety bicycle he named the Rover. The first modern bicycle, it was heavier and more expensive than penny-farthings, but lighter and cheaper than tricycles of the day. In its original form it used indirect steering; later, direct steering was adopted and the bicycle proved to be a hit.

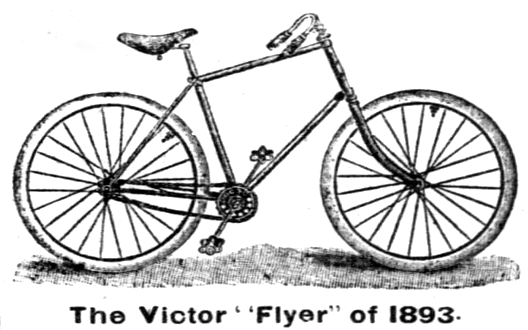
An Overman Victor bicycle of 1893

The Overman Wheel Company, founded 1882, was the first manufacturer of safety bicycles in the United States, in their factory complex in Chicopee, Massachusetts. Following their creation in England, Overman rushed a safety bicycle to production before the end of 1887. Overman was known for making all-steel bicycles with no cast metal parts. The Overman Victor bicycle was said to be of higher quality and lower weight than other bicycles of its time. By 1893, the Overman factory made the complete bicycle, including tyres, saddles, rims, etc.

In Brisbane, Queensland Australia, Engineer Reginald Blunt designed and built the first Queensland safety cycle which was used to race on instead of the penny-farthing.

The safety bicycle was a big improvement on the previous penny-farthing design which it replaced. The chain drive, coupling a large front sprocket (the chainring) to a small rear sprocket (the sprocket) to multiply the revolutions of the pedals, allowed for much smaller wheels, and replaced the need for the large, directly pedaled front wheel of the penny-farthing. The smaller wheel gave a harsher ride; once pneumatic tires were developed and replaced the previously used solid ones, this disadvantage was no longer an issue.

With the center of mass low and between the wheels, rather than high and over the front hub, the safety bicycle greatly diminished the danger of "taking a header" or long fall over the handlebars. This made braking more effective and cycling, previously the reserve of spry, daring young men, safer, and therefore much more popular, especially for women.

Compared with the tricycles of the time, popular with riders less willing to take risks, the safety bicycles were lighter, mechanically simpler, and less expensive.

Its popularity soon grew to be more than the penny-farthings and tricycles combined and caused the bike boom of the 1890s.

== Characteristics ==
Safeties are now characterized by having two wheels of identical – or nearly identical – size, and a chain-driven rear wheel. The most popular form of the safety bicycle frame, consisting of two triangles, is known as a diamond frame. A similar but different frame used in safety bicycles is the step-through frame.

Despite the enormous variety of modern bicycles, recumbent bicycles are the only major variety of bicycle which do not use this same basic design.

== Image gallery ==
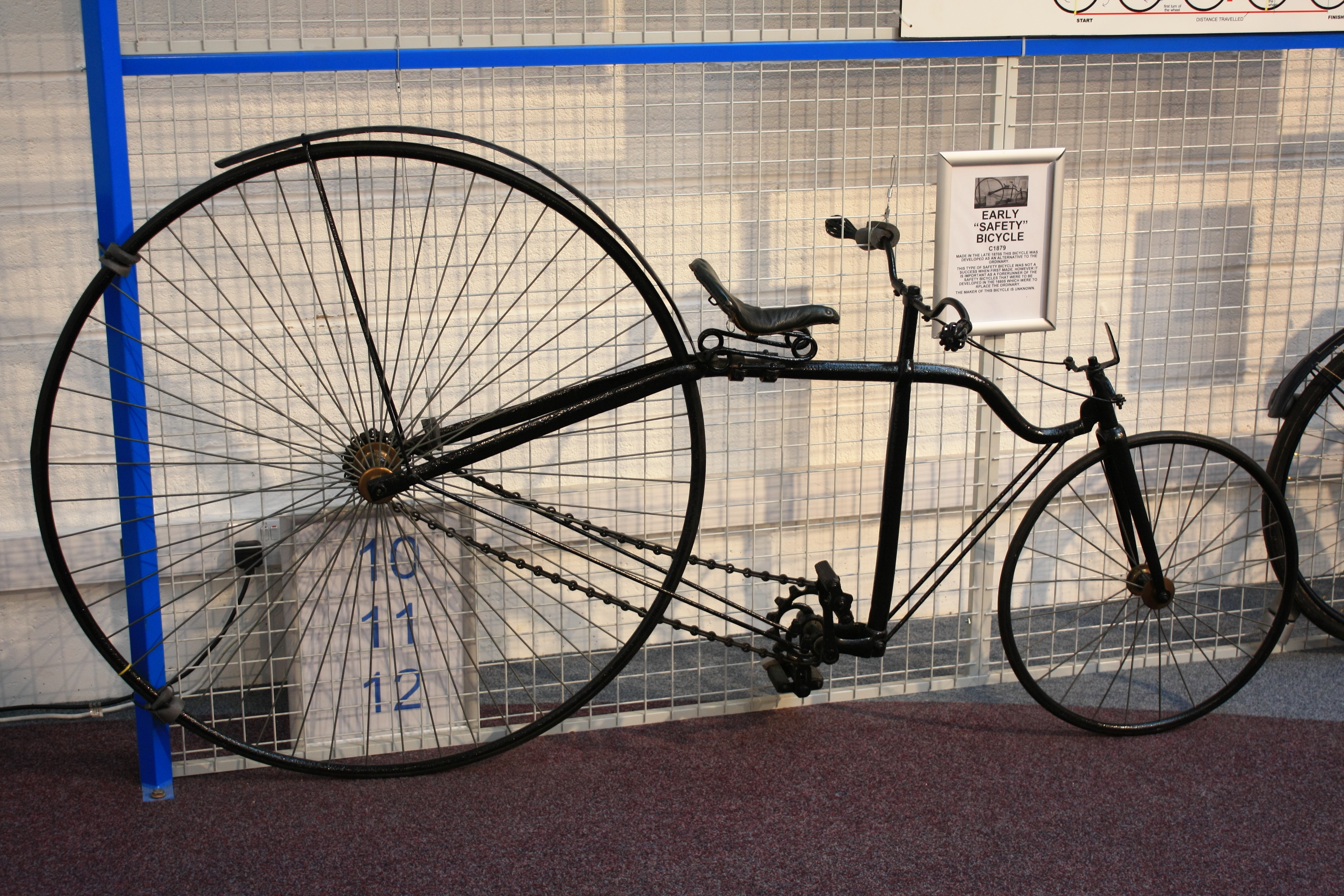
An early safety bicycle, c. 1879 in the Coventry Transport Museum

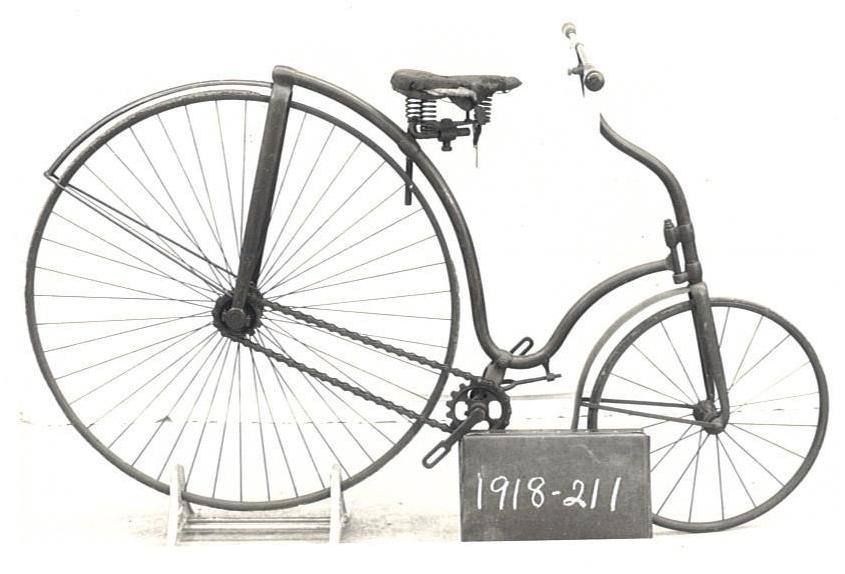
An 1884 McCammon safety bicycle

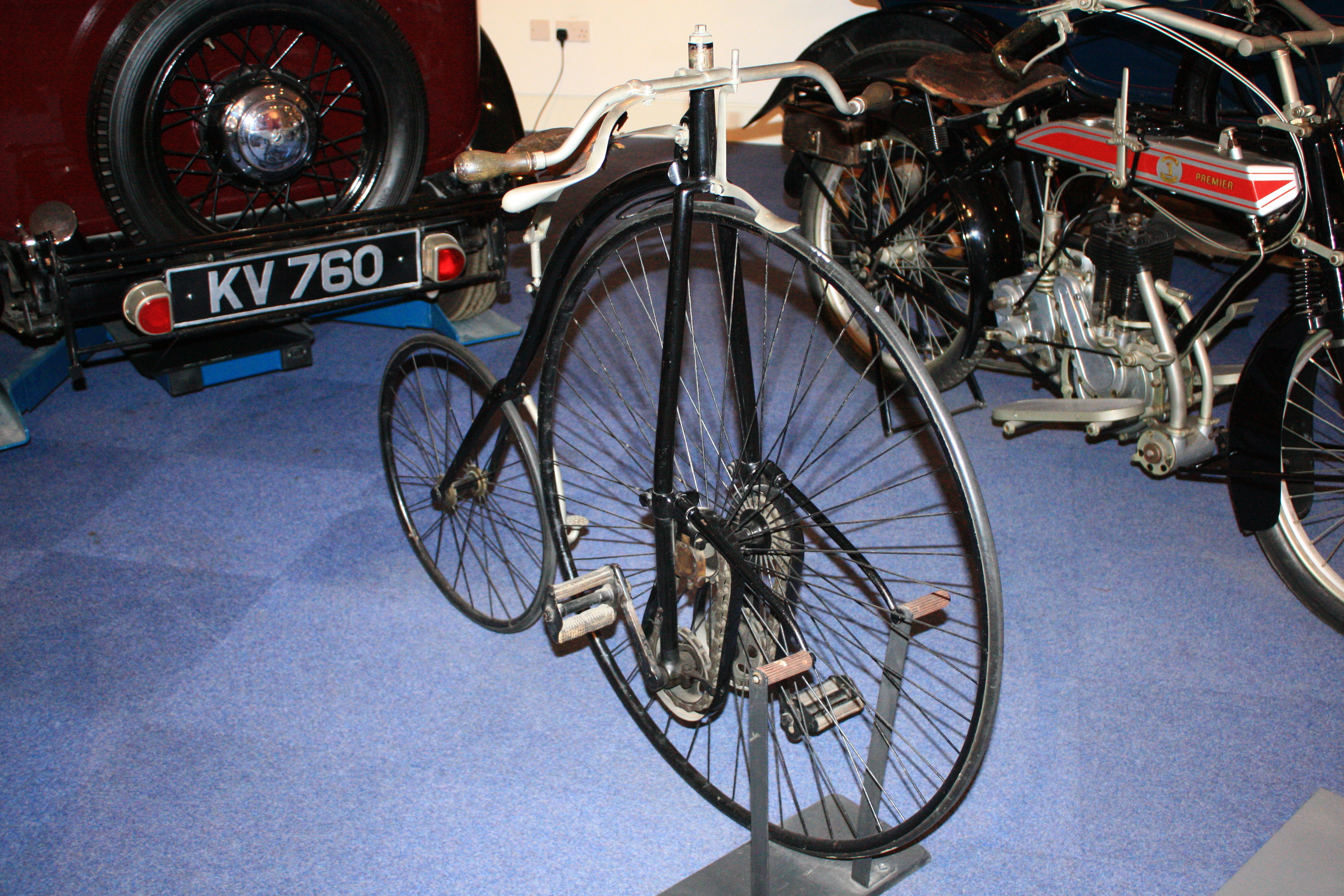
An 1884 Kangaroo dwarf safety bicycle, Coventry Museum

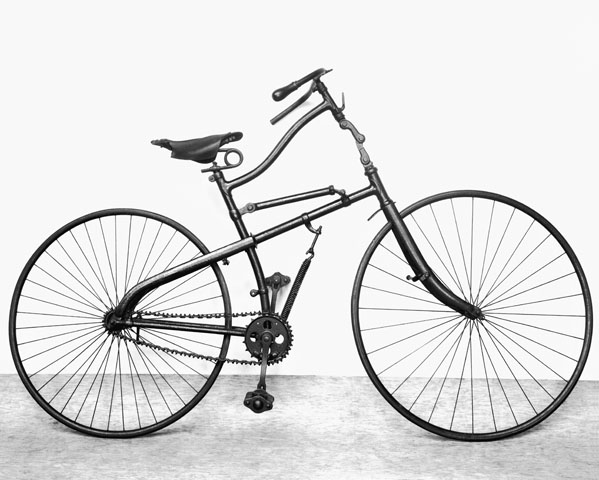
An 1885 Whippet safety bicycle

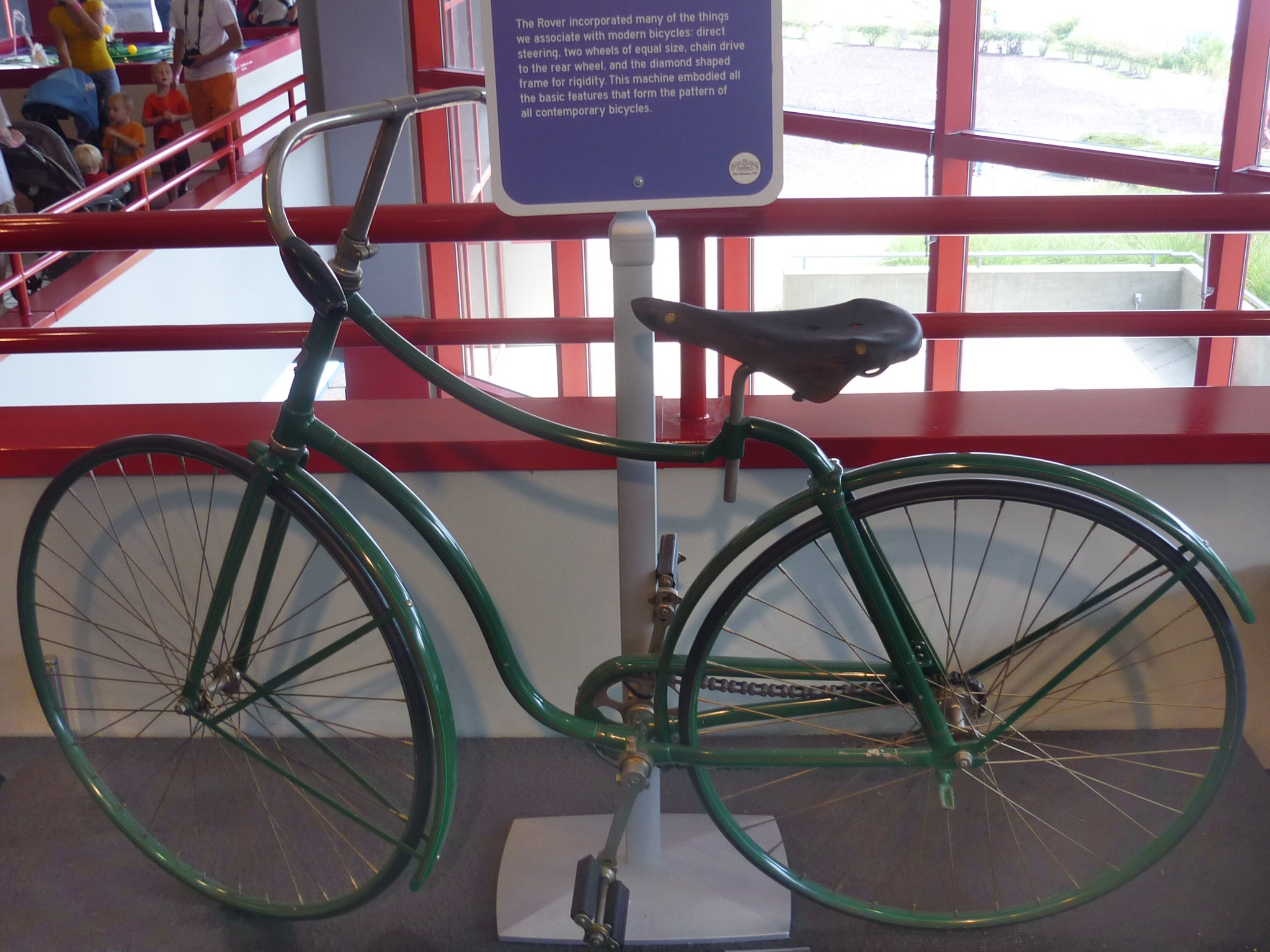
An 1886 Rover safety bicycle

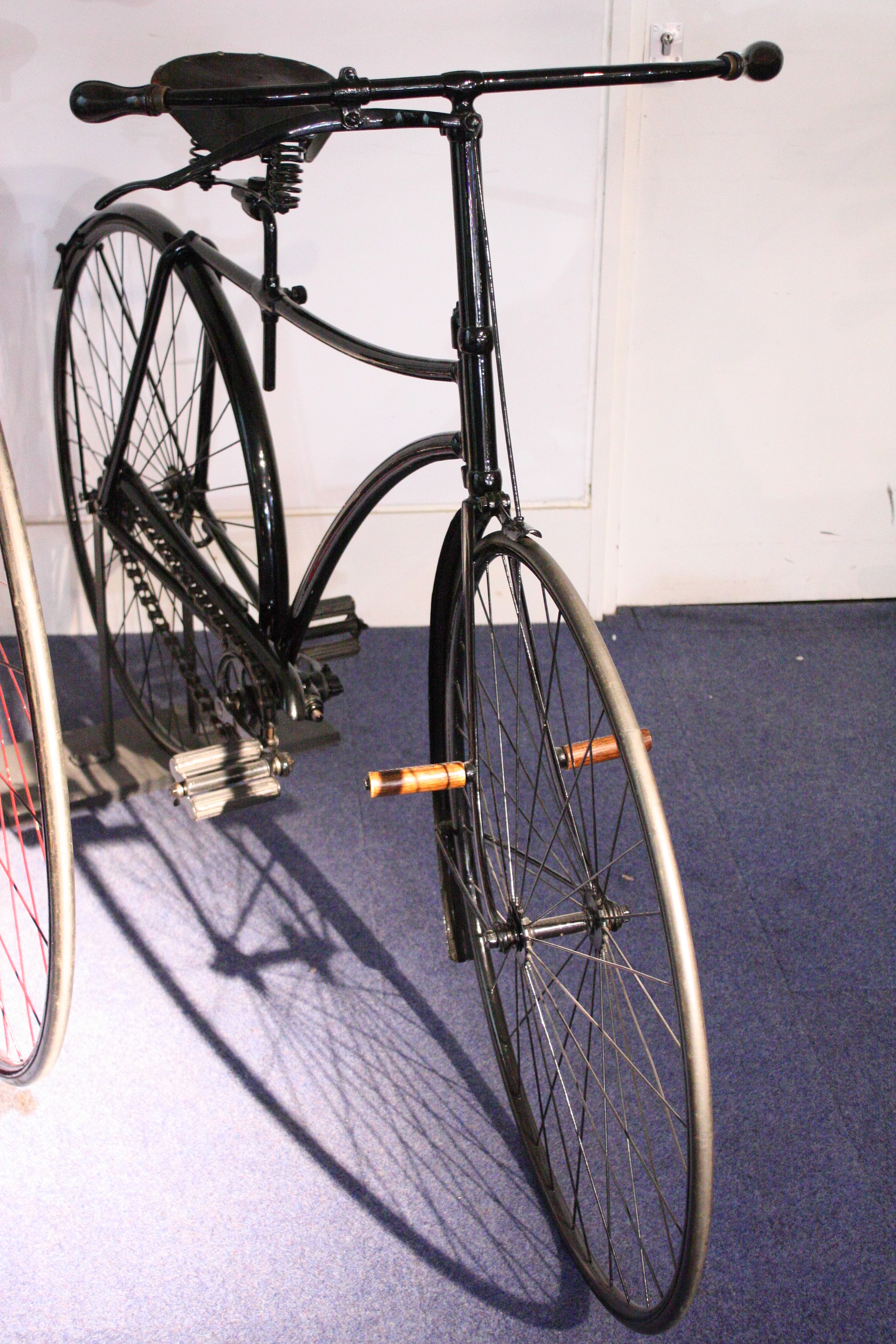
An 1886 Swift safety bicycle, Coventry Museum

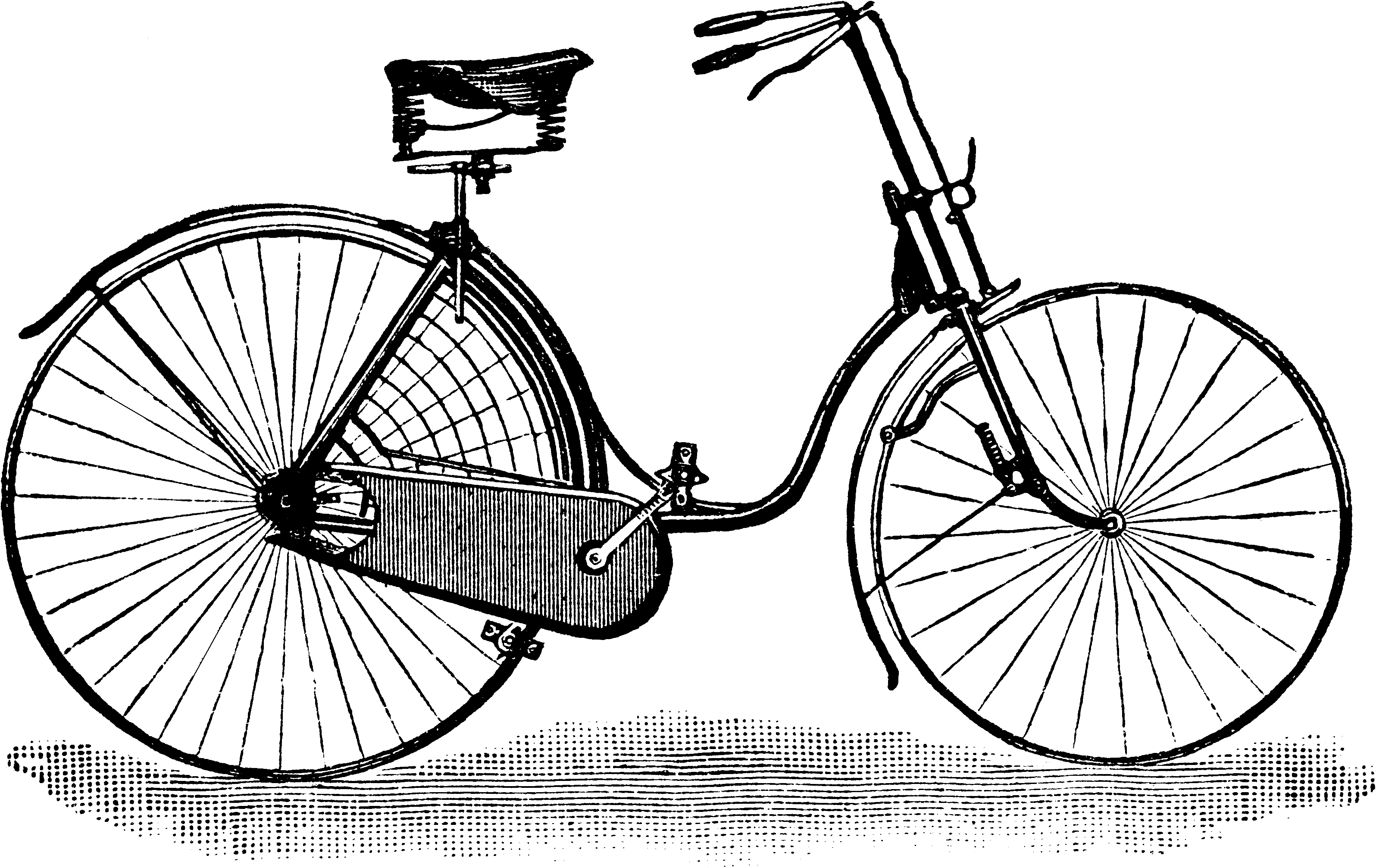
An 1889 step-through safety bicycle

== See also ==
- Dan Albone
- Bicycle frame
- History of the bicycle
- Recumbent bicycle
- List of motorcycles of 1900 to 1909
