= Bordeaux–Paris =

Professional cycle race

- Bordeaux–Paris (France) Bordeaux–Paris route

Race details
- Region: France
- English name: Bordeaux–Paris
- Local name(s): Bordeaux–Paris
- Nickname(s): Derby of the Road
- Discipline: Road
- Type: One-day

History
- First edition: 1891
- Editions: 86
- First winner: (United Kingdom) George Pilkington Mills
- Most wins: (Belgium) Herman Van Springel (7 wins)
- Most recent: (France) Jean-François Rault

The Bordeaux–Paris professional cycle race was one of Europe's classic cycle races, and one of the longest in the professional calendar, covering approximately 560 km (350 mi) – more than twice most single-day races. It started in northern Bordeaux in southwest France at 2am and finished in the capital Paris 14 hours later. The professional event was held from 1891 until 1988. It was held as an amateur event in 2014.

== History ==
Bordeaux-Paris logo

The event was first run on 23 May 1891, and the Derby of the Road as it was sometimes called, was notable in that riders were paced – allowed to slipstream – behind tandem or conventional cycles. From 1931, pacing was by motorcycles or small pedal-assisted Dernys. Pacing was also briefly done by cars. In early events, pacing was provided from Bordeaux. In later events, it was introduced part-way towards Paris. From 1946 to 1985, more than half the distance was paced, Dernys being introduced at Poitiers or Châtellerault, roughly half-way.

The organisers of the inaugural event, Bordeaux Vélo Club and Véloce Sport envisaged that riders might take a few days, but the first edition was won in a continuous ride by George Pilkington Mills. Mills raced through the night to win the 600 km long event in just over a day. Post-war winners include Louison Bobet (1959), Tom Simpson (1963), and Jacques Anquetil (1965). The record for the most victories is held by Herman Van Springel, who won seven times between 1970 and 1981.

=== The first race ===
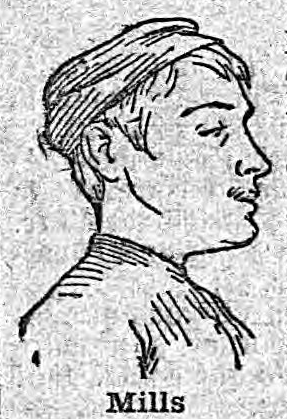
George Pilkington Mills

George Mills won the inaugural Bordeaux–Paris race in 1891. He was invited by the organisers, the newspaper Véloce Sport because of his reputation in an age when long-distance racing was the fashion. A race from Bordeaux in the south-west to the capital in Paris would be the longest annual event in France.

The race started at 5am in the Place du Pont Bastide in Bordeaux. There were 38 riders. As well as the British – Pilkington Mills, Holbein, Edge and Bates – there were a Pole and a Swiss. Mills fell on bad roads after 10 km when he touched with the Frenchman, Jiel-Laval, but neither was hurt. The English group moved to the front when the field began to straggle after the first hour. They led by a mile at dawn after averaging 14 mph. The historian Victor M. Head wrote: "At 10.30 Angoulème was reached and the Englishmen stopped to gulp down bowls of hot soup. When they restarted, Mills began to make all the running, drawing steadily away from his companions until, arriving at Ruffec, Charente, he was half an hour in the lead."

The rapid departure surprised the organisers. A report said:

Everything had been prepared to receive the riders properly [recevoir dignement]: full meals, baths, hot showers, nothing was forgotten, and there were good beds to welcome our heroes, because there was no doubt among the excellent people of Angoulème that it was impossible to ride 127 km on a bicycle without immediately needing several hours' rest. To the great stupefaction of the spectators, not one of the riders took advantage of what had been provided. The eventual winner, G.P. Mills, stopped for several moments at best. He had a plan: he let Holbein eat peacefully at the control because he knew that a real champion, Lewis Stroud, was waiting to show him the way out of town and that, with him as a precious, fast and durable pacer he could build up the lead he needed to win the race.

Mills reached Tours after 215 miles and more than 12 hours on the road. He rested for five minutes, ate raw meat "and a specially prepared stimulant", and set off an hour ahead of the other British riders. "By now," said Head, "the Frenchmen were hopelessly out of the running." He wrote:

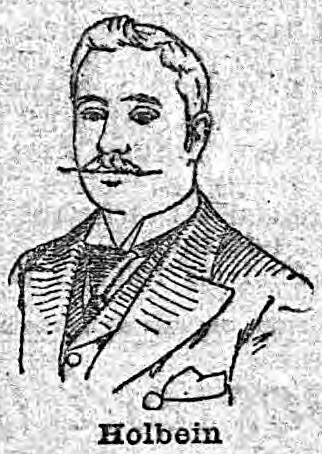
Montague Holbein

Although the judges, the officials, and the large crowd had been waiting impatiently for three hours before the winner's weary, mud-caked figure was seen coming along the boulevard de la Porte Maillot, his reception was "wildly enthusiastic", as one writer put it, and he was escorted in triumph to his hotel. The time of 26h 36m 25s was truly remarkable when one considers the appalling road conditions, poor weather, and the delays, and all the other hardships encountered. The British victory was complete as Montague Holbein (27h 52m 15s) came in second, with Edge, nearly three hours away, third, and Bates fourth.

The Bicycle Union – later renamed the National Cyclists Union – had strict views about amateurism and had demanded its French equivalent ensure that all taking part met its own amateur ideals. Only then would the NCU allow Mills and other British amateurs to take part. When Mills won, the Bicycle Union realised he was the works manager at a bicycle factory and decided he should be asked "whether he paid the whole of his expenses in the above-mentioned race." Only when he could prove that he had did the Bicycle Union concede that he was not a professional.

=== Results – 1891 ===
Position	Name	Time of arrival	Overall time
1	Mills	07:36:25	26:36:25
2	Holbein	08:52:15	27:52:15
3	Edge	11:10:00	30:10:00
4	Bates	11:10:08	30:10:08
5	Jiel-Laval	13:06	32:06
6	Coulibeuf	16:19:55	35:19:55
7	Guillet	17:50	36:50
8	Renault	21:53	40:53
9	Corre	22:35	41:35
10	Gillot	22:43	41:43
11	Gebleux	23:10	42:10
12	Duanip	23:15	42:15

== Monsieur Bordeaux–Paris ==
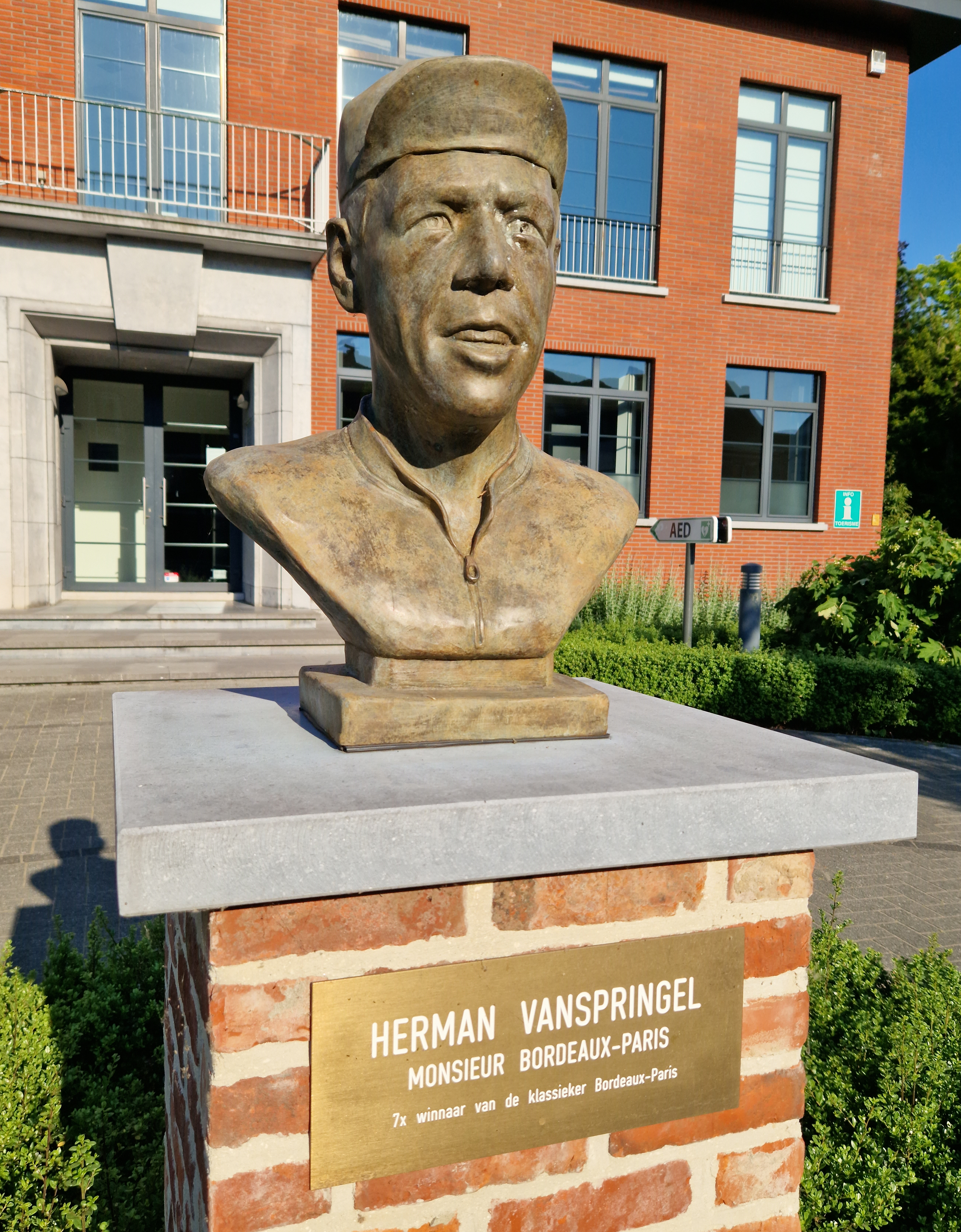
Bust Herman Vanspringel in Grobbendonk

In a timespan of 11 years, Belgian Herman Van Springel would win Bordeaux–Paris for a record of seven times.

Ten times Van Springel took part in the legendary long-distance race and as many times he stood on the podium: a unique feat. Van Springel was known for his exceptional stamina, although initially he did not have much interest in the tough race. "At the time, there was a rather persistent rumour in the peloton that anyone who rode Bordeaux-Paris was exhausted and therefore absolutely unable to play any significant role in the Tour de France. Some even claimed that such a one-off marathon race could mortgage the rest of your career." Van Springel later said.

In 1981, his last year as a professional cyclist, he won his seventh Bordeaux–Paris aged 37.

== Last races ==
Bordeaux–Paris began to lose prestige in the 1980s. It required special training and clashed with riders' plans to compete in the Vuelta a España or Giro d'Italia stage races. Fields began to dwindle and the last motor-paced version was 1985; three non-paced versions were held from 1986 but 1988 proved the last as a professional race.

== Winners ==
- 1891 - George Pilkington Mills United Kingdom
- 1892 - Auguste Stéphane France
- 1893 - Louis Cottereau France
- 1894 - Lucien Lesna France
- 1895 - Charles Meyer Denmark
- 1896 - Arthur Linton United Kingdom and
  Gaston Rivière France
- 1897 - Gaston Rivière France
- 1898 - Gaston Rivière France
- 1899 - Constant Huret France
- 1900 - Josef Fischer Germany
- 1901 - Lucien Lesna France
- 1902 - Édouard Wattelier France and
  Maurice Garin France (2 separate races)
- 1903 - Hippolyte Aucouturier France
- 1904 - Fernand Augereau France
- 1905 - Hippolyte Aucouturier France
- 1906 - Marcel Cadolle France
- 1907 - Cyrille Van Hauwaert Belgium
- 1908 - Louis Trousselier France
- 1909 - Cyrille Van Hauwaert Belgium
- 1910 - Émile Georget France
- 1911 - François Faber Luxembourg
- 1912 - Émile Georget France
- 1913 - Louis Mottiat Belgium
- 1914 - Paul Deman Belgium
- 1919 - Henri Pélissier France
- 1920 - Eugène Christophe France
- 1921 - Eugène Christophe France
- 1922 - Francis Pélissier France
- 1923 - Émile Masson Sr. Belgium
- 1924 - Francis Pélissier France
- 1925 - Henri Suter Switzerland
- 1926 - Adelin Benoît Belgium
- 1927 - Georges Ronsse Belgium
- 1928 - Hector Martin Belgium
- 1929 - Georges Ronsse Belgium
- 1930 - Georges Ronsse Belgium
- 1931 - Bernard Van Rysselberghe Belgium
- 1932 - Romain Gijssels Belgium
- 1933 - Fernand Mithouard France
- 1934 - Jean Noret France
- 1935 - Edgard De Caluwé Belgium
- 1936 - Paul Chocque France
- 1937 - Joseph Somers Belgium
- 1938 - Marcel Laurent France
- 1939 - Marcel Laurent France
- 1946 - Émile Masson Jr. Belgium
- 1947 - Joseph Somers Belgium
- 1948 - Ange Le Strat France
- 1949 - Jacques Moujica France
- 1950 - Wim van Est Netherlands
- 1951 - Bernard Gauthier France
- 1952 - Wim van Est Netherlands
- 1953 - Ferdi Kübler Switzerland
- 1954 - Bernard Gauthier France
- 1956 - Bernard Gauthier France
- 1957 - Bernard Gauthier France
- 1958 - Jean-Marie Cieleska France
- 1959 - Louison Bobet France
- 1960 - Marcel Janssens Belgium
- 1961 - Wim van Est Netherlands
- 1962 - Jo de Roo Netherlands
- 1963 - Tom Simpson United Kingdom
- 1964 - Michel Nédélec France
- 1965 - Jacques Anquetil France
- 1966 - Jan Janssen Netherlands
- 1967 - Georges Van Coningsloo Belgium
- 1968 - Émile Bodart Belgium
- 1969 - Walter Godefroot Belgium
- 1970 - Herman Van Springel Belgium
- 1973 - Enzo Mattioda France
- 1974 - Herman Van Springel Belgium and
  Régis Delépine France
- 1975 - Herman Van Springel Belgium
- 1976 - Walter Godefroot Belgium
- 1977 - Herman Van Springel Belgium
- 1978 - Herman Van Springel Belgium
- 1979 - André Chalmel France
- 1980 - Herman Van Springel Belgium
- 1981 - Herman Van Springel Belgium
- 1982 - Marcel Tinazzi France
- 1983 - Gilbert Duclos-Lassalle France
- 1984 - Hubert Linard France
- 1985 - René Martens Belgium
- 1986 - Gilbert Glaus Switzerland
- 1987 - Bernard Vallet France
- 1988 - Jean-François Rault France
- 2014 - Marc Lagrange France
