= Montague Holbein =

British cyclist and swimmer (1861–1944)

Montague A. Holbein
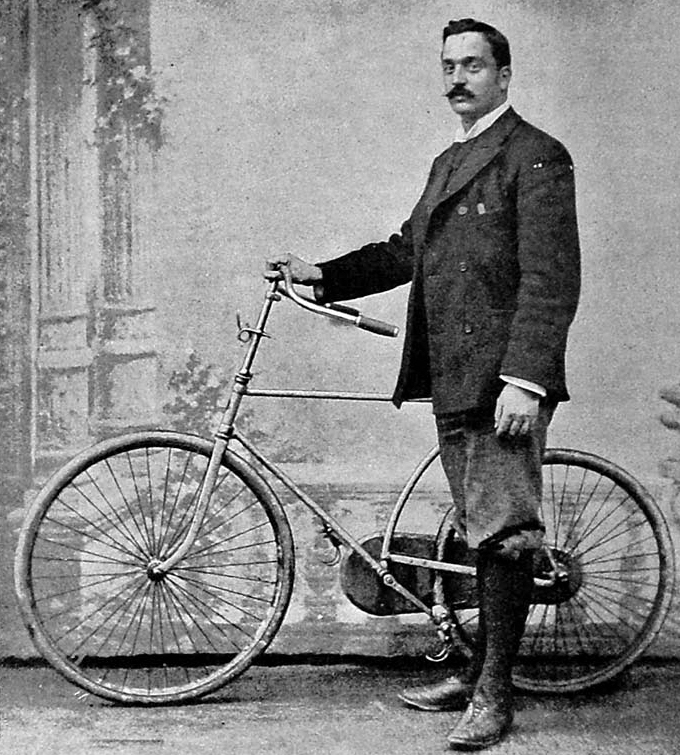

Personal information
- Full name: Montague Alfred Holbein
- Nickname: Monty
- Born: 11 August 1861 Twickenham, London, England
- Died: 1 July 1944 (aged 82)

Cycling career
- Sport: Cycling
- Disciplines: Road racing & Endurance
- Role: Rider

Amateur teams
- Catford Cycle Club
- North Road Cycle Club

Major wins
- Great North Road 24-hours (1888, 1889, 1890)

Montague Alfred Holbein (11 August 1861 – 1 July 1944) was a British champion cyclist and swimmer. He is most known for his second place in the inaugural 1891 Bordeaux-Paris, that was won by his countryman George Pilkington Mills and for several attempts in the early 1900s to cross the English Channel swimming.

== Cycling ==
In the early days of competitive cycling Holbein was one of the absolute stars of the then-dominant British cycling scene. A good example of the dominance of British cycling in those days was the 1891 Bordeaux-Paris, which saw the Brits take the first four places, Holbein ranking second. His specialty was in long endurance races, which is shown by his victories in 24-hour races on the Great North Road and in the Cuca Cocoa Cup at the Herne Hill Velodrome. In total Holbein established 32 British cycling records. Nowadays better known is his second place in the inaugural Bordeaux-Paris, where a group of 4 British cyclists dominated the race.

=== Results ===
1888

- 1st Catford Cycle Club 12 hours
- 1st Great North Road 24 hours

1889

- 1st Great North Road 24 hours
- 1st North Road 50 miles

1890

- 1st Great North Road 24 hours

1891

- 1st Herne Hill 24 hours record
- 2nd Bordeaux - Paris

1892

- London to York tandem tricycle record (with Frank Shorland)

== Swimming ==
Montague Holbein broke several swimming records on the Thames. In 1899 he set a record of 43 miles (69 km) and in 1908 he covered an uninterrupted 50 miles (80 km). Holbein also made several attempts, ultimately all unsuccessful, to swim across the English Channel.

=== 1901 attempt ===
In 1901, Holbein tried to swim from France but was pulled out 4 miles (6.4 km) from Dover. After his English Channel attempt, his eyes were so badly damaged from the salt water that he was unable to see for four days.

=== 1902 attempts ===
On 1 August 1902, Holbein failed again due to a tidal flow, heavy seas and a strong head wind, again 4 miles (6.4 km) from Ramsgate. According to the accounts at the time, he swam for 4 hours 45 minutes and covered a distance of 18 miles (29 km), "the exact distance between the nearest points on the French and English shores."

Holbein was covered with oil and wore a mask. The mask was composed of American sticker's plaster with glass let in to enable him to see, and effectually preserve his eyes from injury.

He started his 1902 Channel crossing doing breaststroke at 25 strokes per minute, but then switched to backstroke at a 20 stroke-per-minute pace. Due to the turbulence in the Channel, his support crew became seasick, and some returned to shore.

During his attempt, he ate beef essence in liquid form and sandwiches, but was eventually pulled out when he could not make any headway against the tides.

On 27 August 1902, Holbein started his third attempt of the English Channel from France to Dover in 63 °F (17 °C) water. However, he was taken out of the water within 1 mile (1.6 km) of Dover after an attempt of 22 hours 21 minutes. His crew used two powerful acetylene lamps to follow him through the night as he started at 3:20 pm. He did not repeat any attempts thereafter.

He once swam 43 miles (69 km) in the Solent.

== Death ==
After his death in 1944, Holbein was buried in Hither Green Cemetery in Lewisham, southeast London.
