= List of cyclists in the 1904 Tour de France =

In the 1904 Tour de France, the favourites for the victory were Garin, Pothier and Aucouturier, who had all performed well in the 1903 Tour de France. Among the competitors was Henri Paret who, at 50 years old, still holds the record of oldest Tour de France cyclist.

== By starting number ==
Legend
No.	Starting number worn by the rider during the Tour
Pos.	Position in the general classification
DNF	Denotes a rider who did not finish

No.	Name	Nationality	Age	Pos.	Time	Ref'
1	Maurice Garin	France	33	DNF	—	
3	Victor Devèze	France		DNF	—	
4	Hippolyte Aucouturier	France	27	DNF	—	
5	François Beaugendre	France	23	DNF	—	
6	Michel Frédérick	Switzerland	31	DNF	—	
7	Pierre Chevalier	France		DNF	—	
8	Lucien Pothier	France	21	DNF	—	
9	Ferdinand Payan	France	34	DNF	—	
10	Adrien Blanqui	France		DNF	—	
11	Jean Dargassies	France	31	4	+ 13h 04' 30"	
13	Henri Gauban	France		DNF	—	
14	Aloïs Catteau	Belgium	26	3	+ 9h 01' 25"	
15	Leopold Treuvelot	France		DNF	—	
16	Auguste Maisonneuve	France		DNF	—	
17	Pierre Desvages	France	37	DNF	—	
18	Giovanni Gerbi	Italy	19	DNF	—	
19	Philippe Jousselin	France	32	DNF	—	
20	Édouard Pillon	France		DNF	—	
21	Grimenwald	France		DNF	—	
22	P. Hibon	France		DNF	—	
23	Jules Sales	Belgium	29	DNF	—	
24	Julien Lootens	Belgium	27	DNF	—	
25	Auguste Laprée	France		DNF	—	
26	Émile Moulin	France		DNF	—	
27	François Marcastel	France	21	DNF	—	
28	Vassela	France		DNF	—	
29	Léon Riche	France		DNF	—	
30	Henri Paret	France	49–50	11	+ 32h 18' 39"	
31	Maurice Carrère	France		DNF	—	
32	Anton Jaeck	Switzerland	22	DNF	—	
33	Charles Laeser	Switzerland	24	DNF	—	
34	Louis Coolsaet	Belgium	19	7	+ 23h 44' 20"	
35	Hubert Dome	Belgium		DNF	—	
36	Lamouline	France		DNF	—	
38	Joseph Achten	Belgium	19	DNF	—	
39	Jean-Baptiste Jacquet	France		DNF	—	
40	Franz Breidenbach	Germany		DNF	—	
41	Eugène Ventresque	France	18	DNF	—	
43	César Garin	Italy	24	DNF	—	
44	Albert Niepçeron	France	20	DNF	—	
45	Giovanni Rossignoli	Italy	21	DNF	—	
46	Émile Lombard	Belgium		DNF	—	
47	Antoine Deflotrière	France		15	+ 101h 28' 52"	
49	Lipman	France		DNF	—	
50	Louis Lecuona	France	19	DNF	—	
51	Philippe De Balade	France		DNF	—	
52	Julien Gabory	France	23–24	DNF	—	
53	Jean-Baptiste Dortignacq	France	20	2	+ 2h 16' 14"	
55	Maurice Lartigue	France	26	DNF	—	
56	Léon Habets	France		DNF	—	
58	Antoine Fauré	France	20	DNF	—	
59	Dieudonné Jamar	Belgium	25	DNF	—	
60	Georges Fleury	France	26	DNF	—	
61	Eugène Brange	France	32	DNF	—	
62	Stéphane Chaput	France		DNF	—	
63	P. Dufraix	France		DNF	—	
65	Romain Lardillier	France	37	DNF	—	
67	Auguste Rist	France		13	+ 35h 01' 20"	
68	Pierre Cnops	Belgium	30	DNF	—	
69	Émile Lambœuf	France		DNF	—	
70	René Saget	France		9	+ 25h 55' 16"	
72	Noël Prévost	France		DNF	—	
73	Auguste Gauthier	France	34	12	+ 33h 14' 02"	
74	Gustave Drioul	Belgium	28	10	+ 30h 54' 49"	
75	Legaux	Belgium		DNF	—	
76	Eugène Delhaye	Belgium	28	DNF	—	
77	Émile Poupin	France		DNF	—	
78	Henri Cornet	France	19	1	96h 05' 55"	
79	Albert Leroy	France		DNF	—	
80	Nicolas Damelincourt	France		14	+ 48h 39' 03"	
81	Octave Doury	France	20	DNF	—	
82	Laurent Tachet	France		DNF	—	
83	Charles Delmilhac	France		DNF	—	
84	Eugène Geay	France		DNF	—	
85	Julien Maitron	France	23	5	+ 19h 06' 15"	
86	Charles Prévost	France		DNF	—	
87	Félix Boyer	France		DNF	—	
88	Henri Boyer	France		DNF	—	
90	Camille Fily	France	17	DNF	—	
92	Monin	France		DNF	—	
95	Auguste Daumain	France	26	6	+ 22h 44' 36"	
96	Gabriel Cistac	France	29	DNF	—	
97	Achille Colas	France	29	8	+ 25h 09' 50"	
99	Eugène Prévost	France	41	DNF	—	
100	Ange Varalde	France		DNF	—	
102	A. Durand	France		DNF	—	
103	Georges Nemo	Belgium	21	DNF	—	
105	G. Sylvain	France		DNF	—	
