= 1904 Tour de France, Stage 4 to Stage 6 =

Cycling race stages

Route of the 1904 Tour de France

The 1904 Tour de France was the 1st edition of Tour de France, one of cycling's Grand Tours. The Tour began in Paris on 2 July and Stage 4 occurred on 17 July with a flat stage from Toulouse. The race finished at the Parc des Princes in Paris on 23 July.

== Stage 4 ==
17 July 1904 — Toulouse to Bordeaux, 268 km (166.5 mi)

Stage 4 result

Rank	Rider	Time
1	Lucien Pothier (FRA)	8h 40' 06"
2	César Garin (ITA)	s.t.
3	François Beaugendre (FRA)	s.t.
4	Maurice Garin (FRA)	+ 1"
5	Philippe Jousselin (FRA)	+ 15' 56"
6	Hippolyte Aucouturier (FRA)	+ 30' 59"
7	Henri Cornet (FRA)	s.t.
8	Julien Maitron (FRA)	+ 40' 24"
9	Aloïs Catteau (BEL)	+ 50' 09"
10	Julien Gabory (FRA)	+ 1h 08' 14"

General classification after stage 4

Rank	Rider	Time
1	François Beaugendre (FRA)	59h 15' 12"
2	Henri Cornet (FRA)	+ 25' 54"
3	Jean-Baptiste Dortignacq (FRA)	+ 2h 48' 53"
4		
5		
6		
7		
8		
9		
10		

== Stage 5 ==
20 July 1904 — Bordeaux to Nantes, 425 km (264.1 mi)

Stage 5 result

Rank	Rider	Time
1	Hippolyte Aucouturier (FRA)	16h 49' 50"
2	Jean-Baptiste Dortignacq (FRA)	+ 4"
3	César Garin (ITA)	s.t.
4	Henri Cornet (FRA)	+ 11"
5	Maurice Garin (FRA)	s.t.
6	Lucien Pothier (FRA)	+ 18"
7	Philippe Jousselin (FRA)	+ 24"
8	Charles Prévost (FRA)	+ 30"
9	Julien Gabory (FRA)	+ 1h 00' 10"
10	Camille Fily (FRA)	+ 1h 47' 10"

General classification after stage 5

Rank	Rider	Time
1	Henri Cornet (FRA)	66h 31' 07"
2	Jean-Baptiste Dortignacq (FRA)	+ 2h 22' 54"
3	Aloïs Catteau (BEL)	+ 6h 48' 14"
4		
5		
6		
7		
8		
9		
10		

== Stage 6 ==
23 July 1904 — Nantes to Paris, 471 km (293 mi)

Stage 6 result

Rank	Rider	Time
1	Hippolyte Aucouturier (FRA)	19h 28' 00"
2	Maurice Garin (FRA)	s.t.
3	Jean-Baptiste Dortignacq (FRA)	+ 10"
4	Lucien Pothier (FRA)	+ 3' 00"
5	César Garin (ITA)	s.t.
6	Louis Coolsaet (BEL)	+ 4' 00"
7	Henri Cornet (FRA)	+ 11' 50"
8	Julien Lootens (BEL)	+ 18' 34"
9	Achille Colas (FRA)	+ 20' 00"
10	Philippe Jousselin (FRA)	+ 43' 00"

General classification after stage 6

Rank	Rider	Time
1	Henri Cornet (FRA)	96h 05' 55"
2	Jean-Baptiste Dortignacq (FRA)	+ 2h 16' 14"
3	Aloïs Catteau (BEL)	+ 9h 01' 25"
4	Jean Dargassies (FRA)	+ 13h 04' 30"
5	Julien Maitron (FRA)	+ 19h 06' 15"
6	Auguste Daumain (FRA)	+ 22h 44' 36"
7	Louis Coolsaet (BEL)	+ 23h 44' 20"
8	Achille Colas (FRA)	+ 25h 09' 50"
9	René Saget (FRA)	+ 25h 55' 16"
10	Gustave Drioul (BEL)	+ 30h 54' 49"
