= 1904 Tour de France, Stage 1 to Stage 3 =

Cycling race stages

Route of the 1904 Tour de France

The 1904 Tour de France was the 2nd edition of Tour de France, one of cycling's Grand Tours. The Tour began in Paris on 2 July and Stage 3 occurred on 13 July with a flat stage to Toulouse. The race finished at the Parc des Princes in Paris on 23 July.

== Stage 1 ==
2 July 1904 — Paris (Montgeron) to Lyon, 467 km (290.2 mi)

Lucien Pothier and César Garin were disqualified after the Tour and Pierre Chevalier was eliminated after the stage.

Stage 1 result and general classification after stage 1

Rank	Rider	Time
1	Maurice Garin (FRA)	17h 07' 06"
2	Lucien Pothier (FRA)	+ 24"
3	Pierre Chevalier (FRA)	+ 19' 54"
4	Michel Frédérick (SUI)	+ 37' 54"
5	Giovanni Gerbi (ITA)	+ 43' 29"
6	César Garin (ITA)	+ 1h 04' 54"
7	François Beaugendre (FRA)	s.t.
8	Émile Lombard (BEL)	+ 1h 05' 24"
9	Henri Gauban (FRA)	+ 1h 06' 09"
10	Antoine Fauré (FRA)	+ 2h 02' 54"

== Stage 2 ==
9 July 1904 — Lyon to Marseille, 374 km (232.4 mi)

Stage 2 result

Rank	Rider	Time
1	Hippolyte Aucouturier (FRA)	15h 09' 00"
2	César Garin (ITA)	s.t.
3	Lucien Pothier (FRA)	+ 1"
4	Maurice Garin (FRA)	s.t.
5	Alfred Faure (FRA)	+ 2"
6	Émile Lombard (BEL)	s.t.
7	Henri Cornet (FRA)	+ 3"
8	Jean-Baptiste Dortignacq (FRA)	s.t.
9	Stéphane Chaput (FRA)	+ 4"
10	Aloïs Catteau (BEL)	+ 40' 00"

General classification after stage 2

Rank	Rider	Time
1	Émile Lombard (BEL)	33h 21' 02"
2	Alfred-Faure (FRA)	+ 57' 30"
3	François Beaugendre (FRA)	+ 1h 21' 28"
4		
5		
6		
7		
8		
9		
10		

== Stage 3 ==
13 July 1904 — Marseille to Toulouse, 424 km (263 mi)

Stage 3 result

Rank	Rider	Time
1	Hippolyte Aucouturier (FRA)	15h 43' 55"
2	Henri Cornet (FRA)	s.t.
3	François Beaugendre (FRA)	+ 8' 11"
4	Lucien Pothier (FRA)	+ 8' 12"
5	Maurice Garin (FRA)	+ 8' 13"
6	Camille Fily (FRA)	+ 25' 08"
7	Jean-Baptiste Dortignacq (FRA)	+ 42' 07"
8	Aloïs Catteau (BEL)	+ 43' 05"
9	César Garin (ITA)	+ 51' 41"
10	Philippe Jousselin (FRA)	+ 1h 30' 37"

General classification after stage 3

Rank	Rider	Time
1	Henri Cornet (FRA)	50h 29' 58"
2	François Beaugendre (FRA)	+ 5' 08"
3	Jean-Baptiste Dortignacq (FRA)	+ 1h 28' 59"
4		
5		
6		
7		
8		
9		
10		
