= 1900 Paris–Roubaix =

Cycling race

Race details
- Dates: 15 April 1900
- Stages: 1
- Distance: 268 km (167 mi)
- Winning time: 7h 10' 30"

Results
	Winner	Émile Bouhours (FRA)
	Second	Josef Fischer (GER)
	Third	Maurice Garin (ITA)

The 1900 Paris–Roubaix was the fifth edition of the Paris–Roubaix, a classic one-day cycle race in France. The single-day event was held on 15 April 1900 and stretched 268 km (167 mi) from Paris to its end in a velodrome in Roubaix. The winner was Émile Bouhours from France.

== Results ==
Final results (1-10)
Rank	Cyclist	Time
1	Émile Bouhours (FRA)	7h 10' 30″
2	Josef Fischer (GER)	+18' 00″
3	Maurice Garin (ITA)	+38' 30″
4	Lucien Itsweire (FRA)	+56' 30″
5	Oscar Lepoutre (FRA)	+1h 55' 30″
6	Edouard Simon (FRA)	+3h 29' 30″
7	Edouard Dubreucq (BEL)	+3h 37' 30″
8	Hippolyte Aucouturier (FRA)	+4h 01' 30″
9	Émile Pagie (FRA)	+5h 04' 30″
10	Lucien Pothier (FRA)	+5h 39' 30″
