= Col de la République =

Mountain pass in France

Col de la République Col de Grand Bois
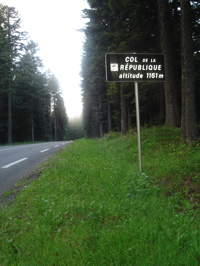
- Col de la République

- Location within France Location within Auvergne-Rhône-Alpes
- Elevation: 1,161 m (3,809 ft)
- Traversed by: D1082

Third Approach
- Location: Loire, Auvergne-Rhône-Alpes, France
- Range: Mont Pilat (Massif Central)
- Coordinates: 45°19′58″N 4°28′49″E

The Col de la République or Col de Grand Bois (1,161 m (3,809 ft)) is a mountain pass in the Pilat massif within the Pilat Regional Natural Park in the Loire department of the Auvergne-Rhône-Alpes region in southern France. Located on the D1082 (ex-RN 82 ) in the commune of Saint-Genest-Malifaux, it connects Saint-Étienne with Annonay in the Rhône valley. The road was constructed in 1830 and the col has an altitude of 1,161 metres.

It was the first climb on the first Tour de France in 1903, but was the scene of notorious violence in 1904 that involved fighting and officials firing gunshot warnings. It has been part of the route on 13 occasions.

== History ==
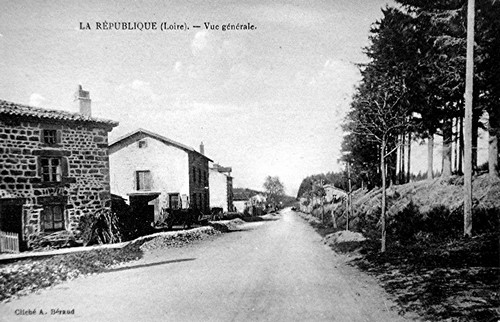
The hamlet of 'République', Loire - circa 1910-1920

The name 'La République' and that of the nearby hamlet of 'La République' derive from the attempt by members of the Beguine religious sect to found an independent community there called the Republic of Jesus Christ. The Beguines were well established in Saint-Jean-Bonnefonds, but in November 1794 they moved 20 kilometres to the plateau to be ready for the arrival of the prophet Elijah.

== Cycling ==
=== Details of the climb ===
From Saint-Étienne (north), the climb is 17 km long. Over this distance, it gains 644 m at an average of 3.8%. The maximum gradient is 6.3%.

From the south, the climb starts at Bourg-Argental; from here, the ascent is 12 km long, climbing 626 m at an average of 5.2%, with a maximum of 7.9%.

=== Vélocio ===
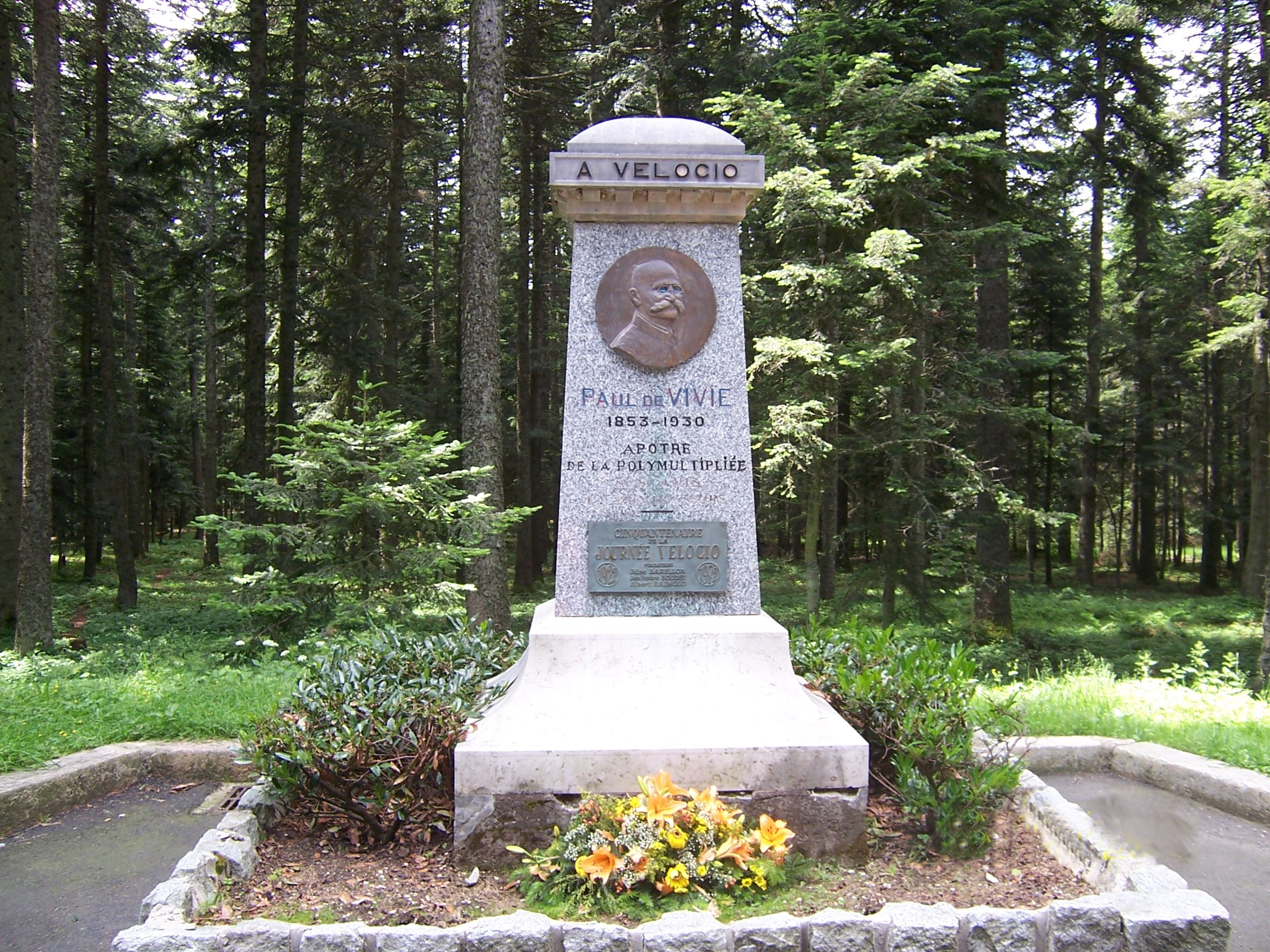
Monument to Paul de Vivie Vélocio at the summit of the col

At the top is a monument in memory of Paul de Vivie, who wrote under the pseudonym Vélocio and was important in the development of bicycle touring. The col de la République was his favourite morning ride. Every year since 1922 the volunteers of the 'Comité Vélocio de Saint-Étienne' have organized the Journée Vélocio (Vélocio Day-Trip), a 12.788 km climb of the col.

=== Tour de France ===
The col de la République was the first pass of over 1,000 metres crossed by the Tour de France, in 1903 during the second stage of the first Tour de France (Lyons - Marseilles via Saint-Étienne) when Hippolyte Aucouturier was the first rider to reach the summit.

The following year, in the 1904 Tour de France, it was the scene of some of the most notorious violence in the history of the tour when supporters of the regional favourite Antoine Fauré attacked his opponents. This caused the organizers to avoid the Loire department until the 1950 Tour de France. In 1905, the tour's organiser Henri Desgrange chose to ignore the col de la République, and focused instead on the introduction of the Ballon d'Alsace, because he saw that he had missed the opportunity of publicity previously.

In the 1904 incident, Andre Fauré led the race and 200 fans tried to stop the rest of the cyclists from following him. Garin hurt his hand during the incident, and Giovanni Gerbi had to give up with broken fingers. The situation was only solved after race officials fired shots in the air. Further on, nails and broken glass had been spread along the road, which caused many flat tires. Because of this help, Fauré was the first on top of the col, but was over-taken by the favourites later.

At the summit a sign post says

Col de la République
1er col à plus de 1000 mètres franchi par le tour de France cycliste le 5 juillet 1903
(The 1st col higher than 1,000 metres traversed by the cycling Tour de France on 5 July 1903)

==== Appearances ====
The col has been used 13 times in the Tour de France, and the first rider to cross the summit on each occasion was:

Year	Stage	Category	Start	Finish	Leader at the summit
1997	13	3	Saint-Étienne	L'Alpe d'Huez	Richard Virenque (FRA)
1978	10	3	Saint-Étienne	Grenoble	Jean-Jacques Fussien (FRA)
1971	10	3	Saint-Étienne	Grenoble	Cyrille Guimard (FRA)
1968	18	3	Saint-Étienne	Grenoble	Aurelio González (ESP)
1966	19	2	Chamonix	Saint-Étienne	Ferdinand Bracke (BEL)
1963	16	3	Saint-Étienne	Grenoble	Federico Bahamontes (ESP)
1961	9	2	Saint-Étienne	Grenoble	Guy Ignolin (FRA)
1959	17	2	Saint-Étienne	Grenoble	Federico Bahamontes (ESP)
1956	19	2	Grenoble	Saint-Étienne	Stan Ockers (BEL)
1954	17	2	Le Puy-en-Velay	Lyon	Robert Varnajo (FRA)
1950	19	3	Briançon	Saint-Étienne	Raphaël Géminiani (FRA)
1904	2		Lyon	Marseille	Antoine Fauré (FRA)
1903	2		Lyon	Marseille	Hippolyte Aucouturier (FRA)

== See also ==
- List of highest paved roads in Europe
- List of mountain passes
