= Leopold Treuvelot =

French cyclist (1876–1914)

Léopold Treuvelot
Personal information
- Full name: Eugène Léopold Treuvelot
- Born: 8 October 1876 Paris, France
- Died: 5 November 1914 (aged 38) Cauroy-lès-Hermonville, France

Cycling career
- Sport: Cycling
- Discipline: Road
- Role: Rider

Professional team
- 1904–1905: Individual

Eugène Léopold Treuvelot (8 October 1876 – 5 November 1914) was a French road racing cyclist.

== Biography ==
=== Personal life ===
Treuvelot was born on 8 October 1876 in the 14th arrondissement of Paris, France, the son of Théophile Treuvelot and Rose Chatelain. At the time of his military registration in 1897, he worked as a house painter. He married Lucie Albertine Gengoux on 20 July 1909 in Boulogne-sur-Seine. They lived in Chaville.

=== Cycling career ===
In 1903 Treuvelot suffered a serious crash against a wall in Blois during the reconnaissance of the 1903 Bordeaux–Paris. He was taken to hospital with a broken collarbone and was therefore unable to start. However some newspapers still listed him among the starters.

In 1904, Treuvelot competed in the 1904 Tour de France. During the first stage from Paris to Lyon, he was reported to be around 50th at the control in Cosne, 174 kilometres into the stage, at 5:40 a.m.. During the next part of the Tour he had to abandon the race. The most notable achievements Treuvelot in 1905 were finishing the cycling monument 1905 Paris–Roubaix in 24th place and he had a top-10 finish in Prix Gladiator that ran over the course Versailles–Montfort–l’Amaury.

=== Military service and death ===
Following the outbreak of the First World War, Treuvelot joined the French Army on 14 August 1914 as a second-class soldier in the 19th Territorial Infantry Regiment. He was subsequently transferred to the 5th Infantry Regiment.

On 5 November 1914, Treuvelot disappeared during fighting in the vicinity of Cauroy-lès-Hermonville, Marne. His body was later recovered and he was buried in the Nécropole nationale de La Maison Bleue at Cormicy, Marne. He was 38 years old.

His death was legally established by the court of Versailles on 24 January 1922, with the judgment transcribed at Chaville, Hauts-de-Seine, on 20 April 1922. Treuvelot was awarded the posthumous designation Mort pour la France and the Croix de guerre with a bronze star. His name is listed on the war memorial in his home town Chaville.
