= 1897 Paris–Roubaix =

Cycling race

Race details
- Dates: 18 April 1897
- Stages: 1
- Distance: 280 km (170 mi)
- Winning time: 9h 57' 21"

Results
	Winner	Maurice Garin (ITA)
	Second	Mathieu Cordang (NED)
	Third	Michel Frédérick (SUI)

The 1897 Paris–Roubaix was the second edition of the Paris–Roubaix, a classic one-day cycle race in France. The single day event was held on 18 April 1897 and stretched 280 km (174 mi) from Paris to its end in a velodrome in Roubaix. The winner was Maurice Garin, an Italian who lived in France.

== Results ==
Final results (1-10)
Rank	Cyclist	Time
1	Maurice Garin (ITA)	9h 57' 21″
2	Mathieu Cordang (NED)	+00' 00″
3	Michel Frédérick (SUI)	+30' 21″
4	Gaston Rivierre (FRA)	+50' 39″
5	Jules Cordier (BEL)	+1h 42' 52″
6	Boinet (FRA)	+1h 43' 03″
7	Henri Aries (FRA)	+1h 53' 12″
8	Guillochin (FRA)	+2h 03' 30″
9	Léopold Trousselier (FRA)	+2h 03' 30″
10	Marcel Kerff (BEL)	+4h 16' 39″
