= 1905 Paris–Roubaix =

Cycling race

Race details
- Dates: 23 April 1905
- Stages: 1
- Distance: 268 km (166.5 mi)
- Winning time: 8h 4' 15"

Results
	Winner	Louis Trousselier (FRA)
	Second	René Pottier (FRA)
	Third	Henri Cornet (FRA)

The 1905 Paris–Roubaix was the tenth edition of the Paris–Roubaix, a classic one-day cycle race in France. The single day event was held on 23 April 1905 and stretched 268 km (167 mi) from Paris to its end in a velodrome in Roubaix. The winner was Louis Trousselier from France.

== Results ==
Final results (1–10)
Rank	Cyclist	Time
1	Louis Trousselier (FRA)	8h 4' 15″
2	René Pottier (FRA)	+7' 00″
3	Henri Cornet (FRA)	+16' 00″
4	Hippolyte Aucouturier (FRA)	+23' 00″
5	Edouard Wattelier (FRA)	+48' 00″
6	Claude Chapperon (FRA)	+57' 00″
7	Alois Catteau (BEL)	+1hr 6' 00″
8	Paul Chauvet (FRA)	+1hr 12' 00″
9	Lazare Brault (FRA)	+1hr 20' 00″
10	Louis Coolsaet (FRA)	+1hr 20' 01″
