= Alfred Faure (cyclist) =

French cyclist

Personal information
- Born: April 25, 1883 Gerzat, France
- Died: February 21, 1935 (aged 51) Reims, France

Cycling career
- Sport: Cycling
- Discipline: Road
- Role: Rider

Professional team
- 1911: Automoto

Major wins
- One stage, Tour de France

Alfred Faure (25 April 1883 – 21 February 1935) was a French road cyclist and motorcyclist. He is best known for winning a stage of the 1904 Tour de France, one of the most controversial editions in the race’s history.

== Biography ==
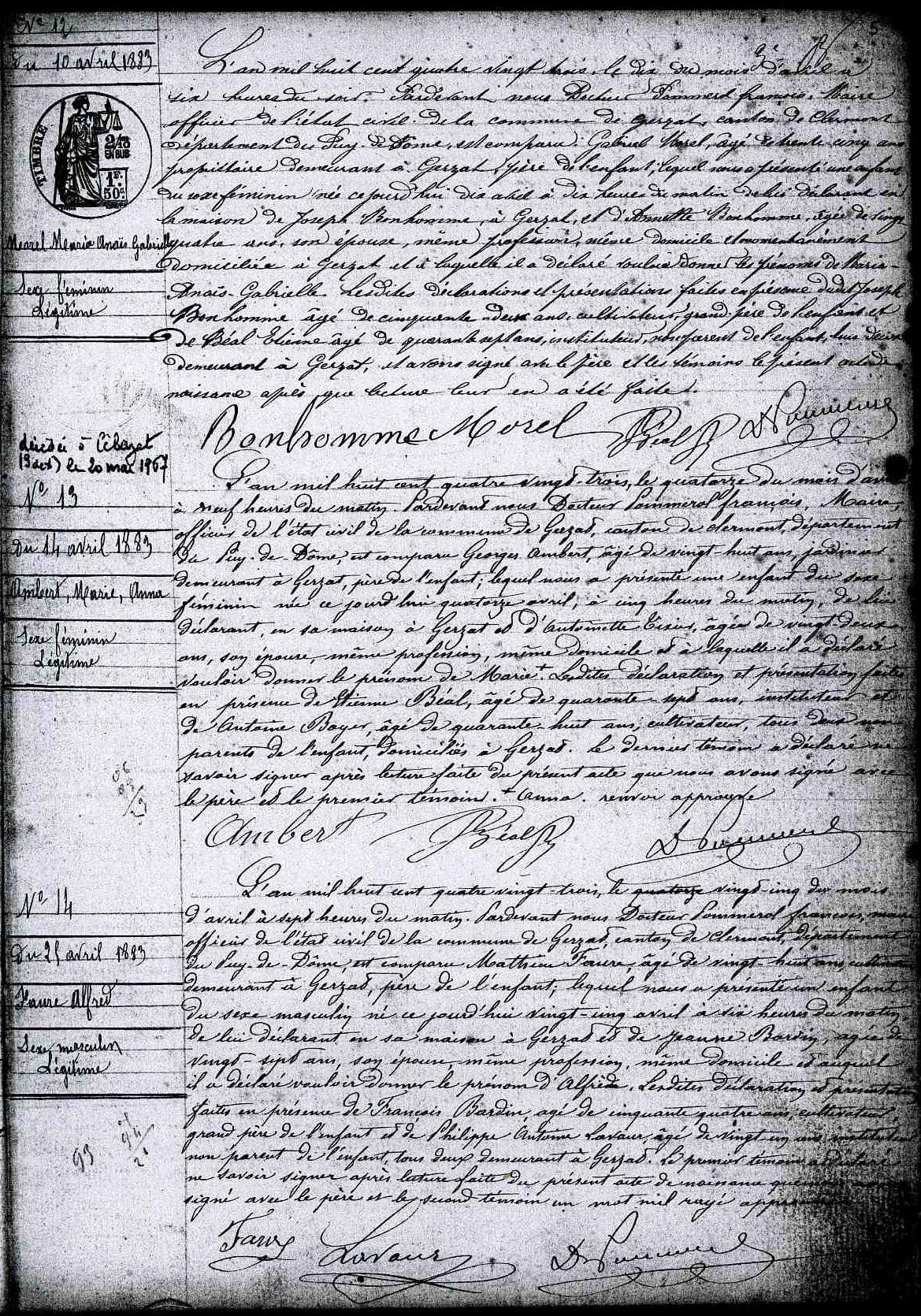
Birth certificate of Alfred Faure

Born in Gerzat, Faure moved with his large family to Saint-Étienne, where he became known as a local cycling talent. He attempted the second edition of the Tour de France in 1904 and would enter several future editions, including in 1911.

During the 1904 Tour, in the second stage from Lyon to Marseille, Faure, being a local favorite in Saint-Étienne, was at the center of a major incident when a group of about 100 supporters attacked race leader Maurice Garin and his team on the climb of the Col de la République. Although Faure only finished fifth in the stage, the first four riders were disqualified for various infractions, and Faure was awarded the stage win retroactively.

He later won the Critérium de la Loire Républicaine in 1912.

== Major results ==
=== By year ===
- 1904
  - 1st, Stage 2 1904 Tour de France
- 1911
  - 9th, Bordeaux-Paris
- 1912
  - 1st, Critérium de la Loire Républicaine

=== General classification results timeline ===
Grand Tour general classification results
Year	1904	1907	1909	1911	1914
Tour de France	DNF (Stage 4)	DNF (Stage 2)	13th	18th	DNF (Stage 3)
