= Henri Paret =

Henri Paret can refer to:

- Henri Paret (cyclist, born 1854), French cyclist who rode in the 1904 Tour de France
- Henri Paret (cyclist, born 1929), French cyclist who rode in the 1952 and 1953 Tour de France
