= Charles Prévost (cyclist) =

French cyclist

Personal information
- Born: Jules Charles Prévost; 26 April 1871 Lens, France
- Died: 31 December 1947 (aged 76) Magny-Danigon, France
- Height: 1.62 m (5 ft 4 in)

Cycling career
- Sport: Cycling
- Discipline: Road
- Role: Rider

Professional teams
- 1904: La Française
- 1905: Saving

Jules Charles Prévost (26 April 1871 – 31 December 1947) was a French professional road cyclist active in the early 20th century.

== Biography ==
Prevost was born in Lens on 26 April 1871. He was the brother of cyclists and Eugène Prévost (1863-1961) and Noël Prévost (born 1866); who both also competed in the Tour de France.

Prévost began competing in the early 1900s, riding both one-day classics and stage races. He achieved notable placings in Paris–Roubaix, finishing 12th in the 1901 Paris–Roubaix and 13th in the 1902 Paris–Roubaix. In 1901 he finished eight in Bruxelles–Roubaix.

He became a professional and rode with La Française in 1904 and with Saving in 1905. He competed in the 1904 Tour de France and 1905 Tour de France. His best achievement was the 8th place at the 1904 edition on stage 5 (Bordeaux–Nantes).

Prévost died on 31 December 1947 at the age of 76. The last year he competed was in 1906 as an individual with his best result the 10th place in Paris–Tourcoing.
