= Gustave Drioul =

Belgian cyclist (1876–1966)

Personal information
- Born: 28 April 1876 Ixelles, Belgium
- Died: 2 June 1966 (aged 90) Ixelles, Belgium

Cycling career
- Sport: Cycling
- Discipline: Road
- Role: Rider

Professional team
- 1902–1905: Cycles JC-Pector

Gustave Drioul (28 April 1876 – 2 June 1966) was a Belgian professional road cyclist. He rode professionally from 1902 to 1905. He was a member of the Cycles JC-Pector team. He is most known for achieving the tenth place overall in the 1904 Tour de France.

As he was iconic in the 1904 Tour de France he was one of the cycling personalities in the 2014 play The Great Bike Race about the 1904 Tour de France, next to cyclists Jean-Baptiste Dortignacq, Jean Dargassies and Lucien Pothier. In thr play, that ran for multiple years, he is depicted as a geriatric cyclist and is played by E. Craig Kemp.

== See also ==
- List of cyclists in the 1904 Tour de France
