= Paul de Vivie =

French publisher and inventor (1853–1930)

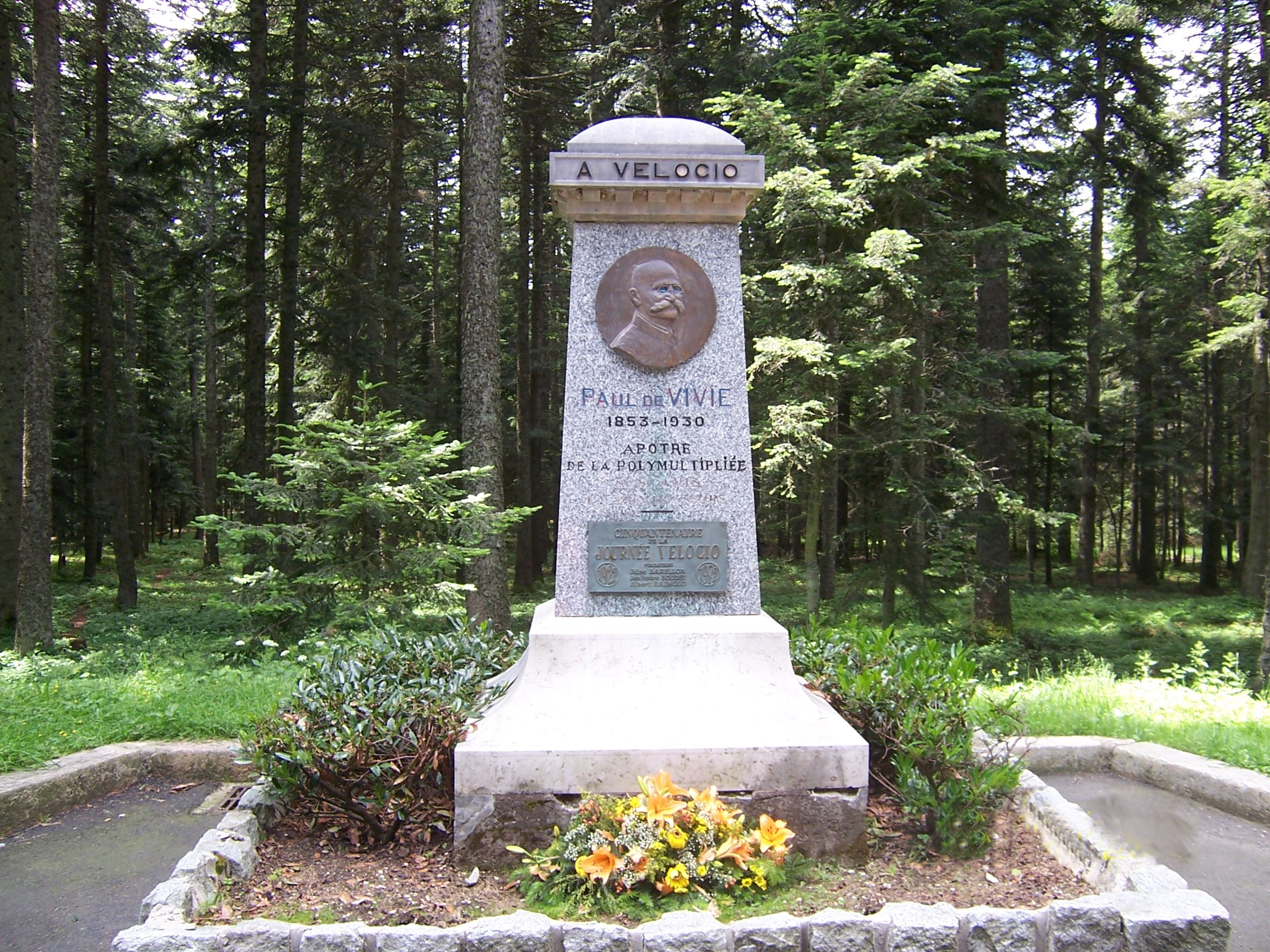
- Monument to Paul de Vivie at the summit of the Col de la République
- Born: 29 April 1853; Pernes-les-Fontaines, France
- Died: 27 February 1930 (aged 76)
- Writing career
- Pen name: Vélocio

Paul de Vivie, who wrote as Vélocio (28 April 1853– 27 February 1930) was the publisher of Le Cycliste, a developer and early champion of derailleur gears, and father of French bicycle touring and randonneuring.

== Background ==
De Vivie was born at Pernes-les-Fontaines, France. His youth was unremarkable except for a love for the classics. His father was a prosperous Gascon with links to the nobility. He came from Saint-Germain-de-la-Sauvetat and worked as the head of post. His mother, Marthe Roman, came from Arles. Paul de Vivie lived at Tarascon, Meyzieu, and studied at Lachassagne, near Lyon until 1870.

De Vivie went into the silk industry as an apprentice and then opened his own business in St-Étienne before he was 30. He married in St-Étienne in 1876. He lived at 6 rue Brossard.

He bought his first bicycle, a penny-farthing when he was 28, in 1881. In that year he became the founding secretary of Les Cyclistes Stéphanois. The club held its first meeting at 1 rue des Arts, St-Étienne, on 23 October 1881. The address was the home of a member, A. Jourjon, and became the club's address when it was registered as a new organisation at the préfecture on 11 March 1882. Evidence that de Vivie was a reasonably prosperous man is shown in a club rule that allowed membership only to amateurs, a definition which excluded ordinary working men. Further evidence is the writer Jean-Pierre Baud's calculation that a bicycle cost 200 francs or 56 times the daily wage of an everyday worker.

Club membership cost 17 francs the first year and 12 francs in subsequent year. Membership was open not only to those who pedalled but others who preferred machines "furnished by steam, electricity and any other propulsion."

A friend challenged de Vivie to ride his new bicycle 100 km in six hours and he set out to the mountain resort of Chaise-Dieu. The peace, adventure and countryside changed his life - and persuaded him he needed a better bike. A year later he bought a Bayliss tricycle, followed by a tandem tricycle and others. His work in the silk industry required trips to England and it was there, in Coventry, then the centre of the world cycle industry, that he was inspired by British bicycles and joined the Cyclists' Touring Club. In 1887, he sold his business, opened the Agence Générale Vélocipédique in St-Étienne to import bikes from Coventry, and began a magazine, Le Cycliste Forézien, renamed Le Cycliste the following year.

== Campaign for multiple gears ==
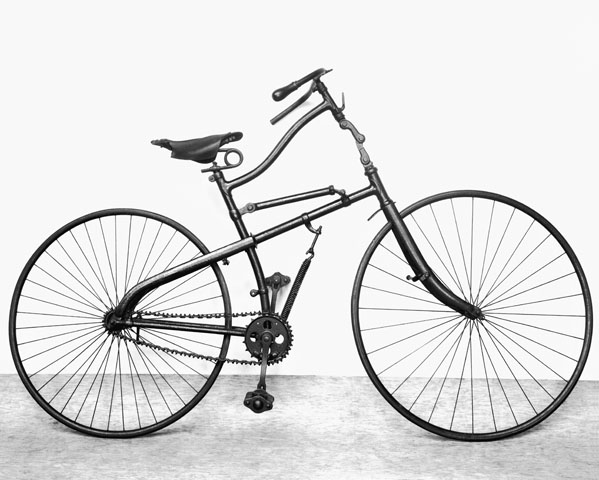
The English Whippet, of which de Vivie used a gear.

De Vivie imported machines from England. In 1889 he made a bike of his own, called La Gauloise. It had a diamond frame, chain and a single gear. De Vivie was riding the col de la République (10 km south east of St Etienne) in 1889 when one of his readers overtook him - smoking a pipe. De Vivie felt challenged but also trapped: if he lowered his gear, he would go slower on the flat. But on the gearing that he had, he could not climb hills fast enough either. British thinking favoured epicyclic and planetary gears, concealed in the rear hub. De Vivie created the derailleur. His first had two chain wheels; the chain had to be lifted by hand from one to the other. He then placed two chain wheels on the left side. The combination gave him four gears. In 1901 Velocio combined his invention with the four-speed proteon gear of the English Whippet, which used a split chain wheel. Pedalling backwards made the two halves of the chain wheel open. Pawls then secured them in one of four positions. De Vivie's development appeared in his Cheminot in 1906, the first derailleur. He overlooked taking out a patent and made barely any money from an invention which changed cycling.

It has been said that de Vivie invented something which already existed, in Britain, and simply made the derailleur better known.

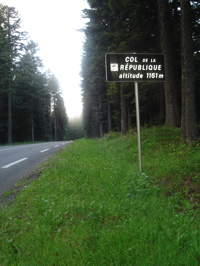
The col du Grand Bois or de la République

Traditional cyclists did not appreciate his gears. The organiser of the Tour de France, Henri Desgrange, dismissed them in L'Auto as fit only for invalids and women. De Vivie campaigned for his invention and rode every morning up the col de la République for the joy of passing riders without them.

The Touring Club de France organised a challenge in 1902 in which a female rider, Marthe Hesse, participated riding a Gauloise with a three-speed derailleur. Hesse was one among only four riders crossing the Tourmalet without setting foot to the ground. Desgrange, though, wrote:

"I applaud this test, but I still feel that variable gears are only for people over 45. Isn't it better to triumph by the strength of your muscles than by the artifice of a derailleur? We are getting soft. Come on fellows. Let's say that the test was a fine demonstration - for our grandparents! As for me, give me a fixed gear!"

De Vivie's invention is in the museum of art and industry at St-Étienne. His friend, Albert Raimond, developed the idea and started the Cyclo gear company. Raimond, like Vivie, was fond of hilly rides.

== Advocacy for small wheels ==
De Vivie was also an early advocate of tires of up to 57mm (2.25 in) cross-section on rims as small as 500mm (20 in), preceding modern advocates of small wheel bicycles such as Alex Moulton. In 1911 he wrote:

"My own experience has gone no further than to 50cm wheels furnished with 50mm tyres, but I can guarantee that in an experiment extending as far as 15,000km covered, they will not have the smallest disadvantage from the point of view of their running. It simply seems to me they are more prone to skidding, but this is perhaps because their tyres have no tread and that the bicycle is very short. That universal agreement has fixed on 70cm as the proper size for wheels does not in any way prove that this diameter is best; it simply proves that cyclists follow each other like sheep.

Make no mistake, uniformity is leading us directly towards boredom and towards routine, whilst diversity, even though it distracts us, holds our attention, our interest and the spirit of enquiry always on the watch. To change is not always to perfect, and I know that better than any others newly come to cyclo-technology. But to stand still, to sink into a rut, that is the worst of things for industries and for men."

Velocio died at St-Étienne, France. His obituary in the Gazette of the Cyclists' Touring Club pictured him with an open-framed small-wheel bicycle.

== Writing ==
Paul de Vivie devised a code for the wise cyclist:
1. Keep your stops short and few.
2. Eat before you're hungry, drink before you're thirsty.
3. Never get too tired to eat or sleep.
4. Add a layer before you're cold, take one off before you're hot.
5. Lay off wine, meat and tobacco on tour.
6. Ride within yourself, especially in the first hour.
7. Never show off.

— Velocio

Vélocio wrote of his tours in a language that inspired a nation - France - in which holidays with pay were unknown:

A shaft of gold pierced the sky and rested on a snowy peak, which, moments before, had been caressed by soft moonlight. For a moment showers of sparks bounced from the pinnacle and tumbled down the mountain in a heavenly cataract. The king of the universe, the magnificent dispenser of light and warmth and life, gave notice of his imminent arrival. But only for an instant. Like a spent meteor, the spectacle dissolved in the sea of darkness that engulfed me in the depths of the gorge. The glistening reflections, the exploding fireballs were gone. Once again, the snow assumed its cold and ghostly face.

Or again:

After a long day on my bicycle, I feel refreshed, cleansed, purified. I feel that I have established contact with my environment and that I am at peace. On days like that I am permeated with a profound gratitude for my bicycle. Even if I did not enjoy riding, I would still do it for my peace of mind. What a wonderful tonic to be exposed to bright sunshine, drenching rain, choking dust, dripping fog, rigid air, punishing winds! I will never forget the day I climbed the Puy Mary. There were two of us on a fine day in May. We started in the sunshine and stripped to the waist. Halfway, clouds enveloped us and the temperature tumbled. Gradually it got colder and wetter, but we did not notice it. In fact, it heightened our pleasure. We did not bother to put on our jackets or our capes, and we arrived at the little hotel at the top with rivulets of rain and sweat running down our sides. I tingled from top to bottom.

== Death and memorial ==
De Vivie was a vegetarian, a speaker of Esperanto and a strict man who started every day of his later life by reading ancient Greek. On 27 February 1930 the last words he read were from Seneca to Lucius:

Death follows me and life escapes me. When I go to sleep, I think that I may never awake. When I wake up, I think that I may never get to sleep. When I go out, I think that I may never come back.

Then he collected his bike and began pushing it across the road. He stepped back to avoid a car and was hit and killed by a tram. His memorial is at the top of the col de la République. Its inscription reads: "Paul de Vivie, alias Vélocio (Pernes 1853 - St-Étienne 1930). Apostle of cycle-touring and promoter of gears [changements de vitesse]. Monument erected by the town of Pernes-les-Fontaines on the 150th anniversary of his birth. Inaugurated 20 April 2003."

He coined the French term cyclo-tourisme, which continues in use. He is buried in the cemetery at Loyasse, near Lyon. His plaque reads: "To their venerable master, the cyclo-tourists of St-Étienne." A road is named after him in St-Étienne.

The American writer Clifford Graves said in May 1965:

Velocio's influence grew, not because of his exploits on the bicycle, but because he showed how these exploits will shape the character of a man. Velocio was a humanist. His philosophy came from the ancients who considered discipline the cardinal virtue. Discipline is of two kinds: physical and moral. Velocio used the physical discipline of the bicycle to lead him to moral discipline. Through the bicycle he was able to commune with the sun, the rain, the wind. For him, the bicycle was the expression of a personal philosophy. For him, the bicycle was an instrument in the service of an ideal. For him, the bicycle was the road to freedom, physical and spiritual. He gave up much, but he found more.

== See also ==
- French bicycle industry
