= 1904 Tour de France =

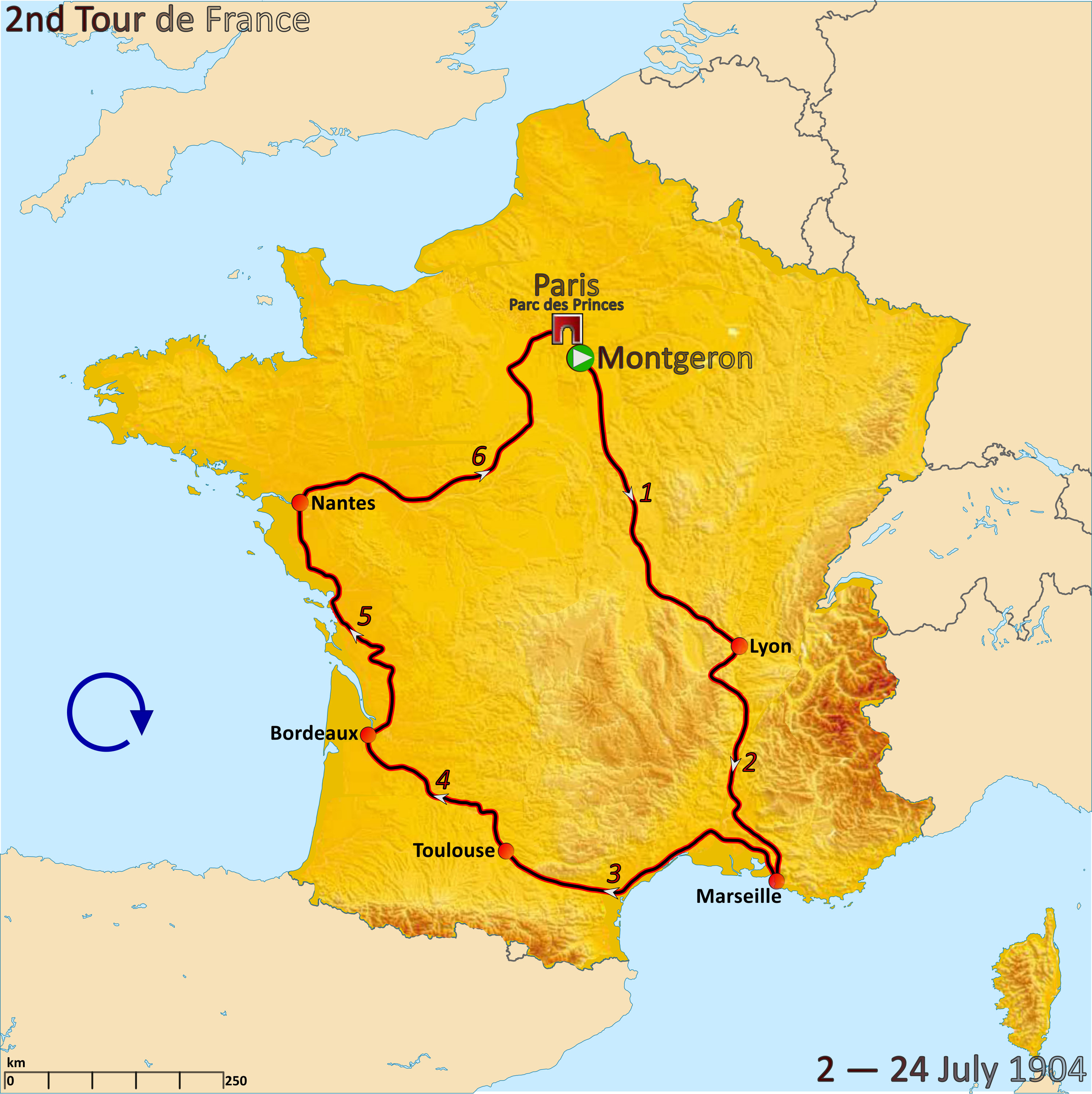
- Route of the 1904 Tour de France followed clockwise, starting in Montgeron and ending in Paris

Race details
- Dates: 2–24 July 1904
- Stages: 6
- Distance: 2,428 km (1,509 mi)
- Winning time: 96h 05' 55"

Results
| | Winner | Henri Cornet (FRA) |
| | Second | Jean-Baptiste Dortignacq (FRA) |
| | Third | Aloïs Catteau (BEL) |

The 1904 Tour de France was the second Tour de France, held from 2 to 24 July. With a route similar to its previous edition, 1903 Tour de France winner Maurice Garin seemed to have repeated his win by a small margin over Lucien Pothier, while Hippolyte Aucouturier won four of the six stages. But the race became a victim of its own success, plagued by scandals; cyclists were accused of having taken trains during the race. Twelve cyclists, including the first four of the final classification and all stage winners, were disqualified by the Union Vélocipédique Française (UVF). Henri Cornet, originally the fifth-place finisher, was awarded the victory four months after the race. The problems caused the Tour de France to be provisionally cancelled, and subsequently the 1905 Tour de France was run with different rules from the 1903 and 1904 editions.

== Innovations and changes ==
The initial Tour de France of 1903 had been a large success, and it was quickly decided to organise it again in 1904. The route was identical, with the same six stages. The rules were the same as in 1903, with one exception: cyclists could not enter in just one stage, but had to join for the entire race. The favourites for the victory were Garin, Pothier and Aucouturier, who had performed well in the 1903 Tour de France. Among the competitors was Henri Paret who, at 50 years old, still holds the record of oldest Tour de France cyclist.

In the 1903 Tour de France, the organisation guaranteed that the first 50 cyclists in the final general classification would earn at least 5 francs per day. In 1904, if not more than 50 cyclists would finish, also cyclists who dropped out during the race would still get 5 francs for the days they had been in the race. This rule was added to attract cyclists who otherwise would not enter, because the Tour needed enough competitors to remain credible.

== Race incidents ==
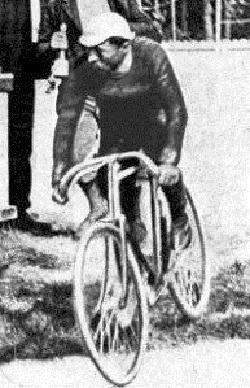
Maurice Garin, initially declared winner of the 1904 Tour de France.

In the first stage, the riders fell after only a few kilometres. Lipman broke a finger, and became the first rider to abandon this Tour. Around 100 km in the race, Lucien Pothier lost ten minutes to the main group, led by Maurice Garin, because of a broken bicycle. In Cosne, at 174 km, Pothier had reached the leading group. Aucouturier had lost more than one hour at that point. Just before the next control post in Nevers, Aucouturier fell on his face, and continued the race covered in blood. In the last part of the race, Maurice Garin and Lucien Pothier rode away from the others. They were attacked by four masked men in a car, but still finished as the first two, with Garin beating Pothier by 50 m. The many flat tires and crashes of Aucouturier, seemingly the results of sabotage, gave him a time loss of several hours.

After the stage, three cyclists were punished: Aucouturier and Samson received fines of 500 and 250 francs, Aucouturier for having a cyclist not in the race following him, Samson for riding in the slipstream of a car. Chevallier, who had finished third, was disqualified for resting in a car for 45 minutes.

During the stage, Ferdinand Payan had been disqualified. Some sources indicate he was helped by a motor, others that he was helped by riders not in the race. In that first stage, Garin had asked the race official Lefèvre for food, which was illegal. Lefèvre, who knew that Garin was the star of the race, broke the rules and gave him the food, because he did not want to be responsible for Garin leaving the race because of hunger. The news that Garin had received illegal help quickly spread, and caused the fanatical crowd to take action.

For the second stage, the organisers had made the option to postpone the start by two hours, in case the mistral wind was making cycling difficult. This was not necessary, so the riders started at midnight as planned.

During this stage, Antoine Fauré led close to his hometown, and 200 fans tried to stop the rest of the cyclists from following him. Garin hurt his hand during the incident, and Giovanni Gerbi was knocked unconscious, and had to give up with broken fingers. The situation was only solved after race officials fired shots in the air. Further on, nails and broken glass had been spread along the road, which caused many flat tires. Because of this help, Fauré was the first on top of the Col de la République, but was taken over by the favourites later. Aucouturier won the sprint. When the riders reached Marseille, they complained that there had been too many incidents in this stage, and the stage results should be cancelled. In the last part, they had been stopped by a large group of cyclists. Maurice Garin had been attacked, and his arm had been injured: he finished the stage steering with only one hand. There was so much confusion at the last controle post, that the exact arrival times of the cyclists were not recorded.

In the third stage, the Tour reached Nîmes, near the home town of Payan, whose fans were angry because of his disqualification. They threw rocks at the riders, and barricaded the road. The cyclists had troubles passing through Nîmes, and several were injured. The most important event for the general classification was when César Garin's bicycle was broken by attackers; he had to find a new bicycle, which took him 15 minutes. Further on, nails and broken glass were spread along the road. Many riders punctured, but there were no serious falls. The cyclists passed this part walking. After Nîmes, a leading group of five cyclists was formed: Maurice Garin, Pothier, Aucouturier, Cornet and Beaugendre. Aucouturier and Cornet escaped, and Aucouturier won, beating Cornet in the sprint.

The fourth stage was run without the incidents that plagued the first three stages. Pothier, Maurice and César Garin and Beaugendre reached Bordeaux together, and the stage was decided by the final kilometre in the velodrome, where Pothier recorded the fastest time.

In the fifth stage, nails on the road again causing punctures. As mechanical assistance was not allowed, Cornet had to ride the last 40 km on two flat tires. Aucouturier won this stage, his third one, but was way behind in the general classification, which Garin led, with only 28 seconds margin to Pothier.

In the sixth stage, Aucouturier, Garin and Dortignac escaped in the last kilometres. Aucouturier signed first at the control post in Ville-d'Avray. From that point, the race was neutralised until the velodrome Parc-des-Princes, where the riders would ride the final kilometre. At the moment that the riders arrived in Paris, it started to rain. The organisers decided together with the cyclists to exclude the final kilometre from the race, and make the control post in Ville-d'Avray the end of the race. This made Aucouturier the winner of the stage. Maurice Garin finished second, which made him the overall winner.

== Initial results before disqualifications ==
Initially, Maurice Garin was declared the winner, having led the race from start to end. Hippolyte Aucouturier won four stages. In total, 27 cyclists finished. For each cyclist, the times they had needed in each stage was added up for the general classification. The cyclist with the least accumulated time after the last stage was the winner.

Stage characteristics and winners before disqualifications
| Stage | Date | Course | Distance | Type (Note: In 1904, there was no distinction in the rules between plain stages and mountain stages; the icons shown here indicate which stages included mountains.) | | Winner | Race leader |
|---|---|---|---|---|---|---|---|
| 1 | 2 July | Montgeron to Lyon | 467 km (290 mi) | Plain stage | Plain stage | Maurice Garin (FRA) | Maurice Garin (FRA) |
| 2 | 9 July | Lyon to Marseille | 374 km (232 mi) | Stage with mountain | Stage with mountain(s) | Hippolyte Aucouturier (FRA) | Maurice Garin (FRA) |
| 3 | 13 July | Marseille to Toulouse | 424 km (263 mi) | Plain stage | Plain stage | Hippolyte Aucouturier (FRA) | Maurice Garin (FRA) |
| 4 | 17 July | Toulouse to Bordeaux | 268 km (167 mi) | Plain stage | Plain stage | Lucien Pothier (FRA) | Maurice Garin (FRA) |
| 5 | 20 July | Bordeaux to Nantes | 425 km (264 mi) | Plain stage | Plain stage | Hippolyte Aucouturier (FRA) | Maurice Garin (FRA) |
| 6 | 23 July | Nantes to Paris | 471 km (293 mi) | Plain stage | Plain stage | Hippolyte Aucouturier (FRA) | Maurice Garin (FRA) |
| | Total | | 2,428 km (1,509 mi) | | | | |

Final general classification before disqualifications
| Rank | Rider | Time |
|---|---|---|
| 1 | Maurice Garin (FRA) | 93h 06' 24" |
| 2 | Lucien Pothier (FRA) | +6' 28" |
| 3 | César Garin (ITA) | + 1h 51' 03" |
| 4 | Hippolyte Aucouturier (FRA) | +2h 52' 26" |
| 5 | Henri Cornet (FRA) | +2h 59' 27" |
| 6 | Jean-Baptiste Dortignacq (FRA) | +5h 15' 36" |
| 7 | Philippe Jousselin (FRA) | +8h 33' 42" |
| 8 | Aloïs Catteau (BEL) | +12h 00' 56" |
| 9 | Camille Fily (FRA) | +15h 36' 42" |
| 10 | Jean Dargassies (FRA) | +16h 04' 01" |

== Disqualification ==
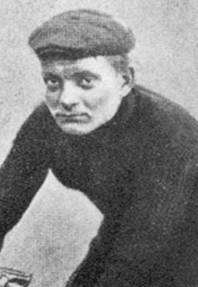
Henri Cornet, the winner of the 1904 Tour de France after the original top four finishers had been disqualified.

During the race, nine riders were excluded because of, among other actions, illegal use of cars or trains. The Tour organisers were happy with the result, but the Union Vélocipédique Française (UVF) started an investigation after complaints from other cyclists. Their investigative committee heard testimony from dozens of competitors and witnesses, and, in December 1904, disqualified all the stage winners and the first four finishers (Maurice Garin, Pothier, César Garin, and Aucouturier). Ten of those disqualified were banned for one year, Maurice Garin for two years and the remaining two for life. In total, 29 riders were punished. The reasons for the disqualification were never made public.

Fifth-placed Henri Cornet, aged 19, then became the youngest ever winner of the Tour. Cornet had also been warned after he had received a lift by a car. Only 15 cyclists from the original 27 that finished were not disqualified.

Following the disqualifications, the Tour de France came nearest in history to being permanently cancelled. The race organiser Henri Desgrange, said he would never run the race again because it had been overtaken by the "blind emotions" of those who attacked or helped riders as they passed. Desgrange was also upset that the UVF had imposed judgement on his race when he had already disciplined riders as he saw fit.

An angry exchange ensued between Desgrange and the UVF but the letters and the detailed complaints that led to the UVF's actions were lost when the Tour de France archives were transported south in 1940 to avoid the German invasion and were never seen again.

Until the end of his life, Garin always said that he was the rightful winner of the 1904 Tour de France, but according to Les Woodland, Garin confessed to a friend that he had cheated.

== Final results ==
After the disqualifications, the first four cyclists of the initial classification were disqualified. In the new classification, only 15 cyclists had finished:

Stage characteristics and winners after disqualifications
| Stage | Date | Course | Distance | | | Winner | Race leader |
|---|---|---|---|---|---|---|---|
| 1 | 2 July | Montgeron to Lyon | 467 km (290 mi) | Plain stage | Plain stage | Michel Frédérick (SUI) | Michel Frédérick (SUI) |
| 2 | 9 July | Lyon to Marseille | 374 km (232 mi) | Stage with mountain | Stage with mountain(s) | Alfred Faure (FRA) | Emile Lombard (BEL) |
| 3 | 13 July | Marseille to Toulouse | 424 km (263 mi) | Plain stage | Plain stage | Henri Cornet (FRA) | Henri Cornet (FRA) |
| 4 | 17 July | Toulouse to Bordeaux | 268 km (167 mi) | Plain stage | Plain stage | François Beaugendre (FRA) | François Beaugendre (FRA) |
| 5 | 20 July | Bordeaux to Nantes | 425 km (264 mi) | Plain stage | Plain stage | Jean-Baptiste Dortignacq (FRA) | Henri Cornet (FRA) |
| 6 | 23 July | Nantes to Paris | 471 km (293 mi) | Plain stage | Plain stage | Jean-Baptiste Dortignacq (FRA) | Henri Cornet (FRA) |
| | Total | | 2,428 km (1,509 mi) | | | | |

Final general classification after disqualifications (1–10)
| Rank | Rider | Time |
|---|---|---|
| 1 | Henri Cornet (FRA) | 96h 05' 55" |
| 2 | Jean-Baptiste Dortignacq (FRA) | + 2h 16' 14" |
| 3 | Aloïs Catteau (BEL) | + 9h 01' 25" |
| 4 | Jean Dargassies (FRA) | + 13h 04' 30" |
| 5 | Julien Maitron (FRA) | + 19h 06' 15" |
| 6 | Auguste Daumain (FRA) | + 22h 44' 36" |
| 7 | Louis Coolsaet (BEL) | + 23h 44' 20" |
| 8 | Achille Colas (FRA) | + 25h 09' 50" |
| 9 | René Saget (FRA) | + 25h 55' 16" |
| 10 | Gustave Drioul (BEL) | + 30h 54' 49" |

Final general classification (11–15)
| Rank | Rider | Time |
|---|---|---|
| 11 | Henri Paret (FRA) | + 32h 18' 39" |
| 12 | Auguste Gauthier (FRA) | + 33h 14' 02" |
| 13 | Auguste Rist (FRA) | + 35h 01' 20" |
| 14 | Damelincourt (FRA) | + 48h 39' 03" |
| 15 | Antoine Deflotriere (FRA) | + 101h 28' 52" |

== Aftermath ==
Because of the scandals associated with this Tour, Desgrange wanted to stop the race. He however changed his mind, and the rules were changed to prevent cyclists from cheating: the 1905 Tour de France would be decided with a points system. Tour de France 1904 winner Cornet would enter the Tour de France for seven more times, but would never again play an important role.

== Bibliography ==
- Augendre, Jacques (2016). "Guide historique" [Historical guide] (PDF). Tour de France (in French). Paris: Amaury Sport Organisation. Archived (PDF) from the original on 17 August 2016.
- McGann, Bill; McGann, Carol (2006). The Story of the Tour de France: 1903–1964. Vol. 1. Indianapolis, IN: Dog Ear Publishing. ISBN 978-1-59858-180-5.
- Thompson, Christopher S. (2006). The Tour de France: A Cultural History. Oakland, CA: University of California Press. ISBN 978-0-520-24760-4.
