= 1904 Paris–Roubaix =

Cycling race

Race details
- Dates: 3 April 1904
- Stages: 1
- Distance: 268 km (167 mi)
- Winning time: 8h 14' 30"

Results
	Winner	Hippolyte Aucouturier (FRA)
	Second	César Garin (ITA)
	Third	Lucien Pothier (FRA)

The 1904 Paris–Roubaix was the ninth edition of the Paris–Roubaix, a classic one-day cycle race in France. The single day event was held on 3 April 1904 and stretched 268 km (167 mi) from Paris to its end in a velodrome in Roubaix. The winner was Hippolyte Aucouturier from France.

== Results ==
Final results (1–10)
Rank	Cyclist	Time
1	Hippolyte Aucouturier (FRA)	8h 14' 30″
2	César Garin (ITA)	+00' 00″
3	Lucien Pothier (FRA)	+2' 50″
4	Édouard Wattelier (FRA)	+12' 50″
5	Léon Georget (FRA)	+12' 50″
6	Alois Catteau (BEL)	+15' 40″
7	Eugène Christophe (FRA)	+17' 30″
8	Paul Trippier (FRA)	+23' 30″
9	Emile Pagie (FRA)	+27' 30″
10	Julien Lootens (BEL)	+27' 30″
