= Gaston Rivierre =

French cyclist (1862–1942)

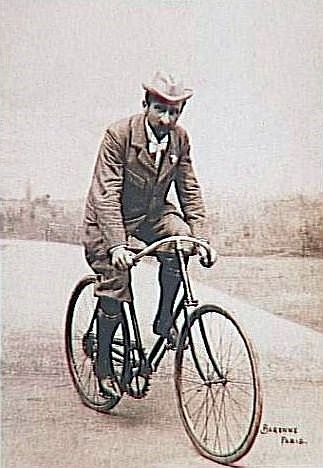
- Gaston Rivierre

Personal information
- Born: 3 June 1862 Asnières-sur-Seine, France
- Died: 1 December 1942 (aged 80) Levallois-Perret, France

Cycling career
- Sport: Cycling
- Role: Rider

Gaston Rivierre (3 June 1862 – 1 December 1942) was a French racing cyclist. He was born in Asnières-sur-Seine and died in Levallois-Perret. A member of the first generation of professional cyclists, he won the 1894 Paris–Lyon–Paris, the 1896 24-hour race of Bol d'Or, the 1896, 1897 and 1898 Bordeaux–Paris, and finished fourth in the 1897 Paris–Roubaix.
