= Achille Colas =

French cyclist (1874–1954)

Personal information
- Born: 16 August 1874 Blois, France
- Died: 15 February 1954 (aged 79)

Cycling career
- Sport: Cycling
- Discipline: Road
- Role: Rider

Professional team
- 1904: Davignon

Achille Colas (16 August 1874 – 15 February 1954) was a French professional road racing cyclist. He rode for the Davignon team. He is most known for finishing eighth overall in the 1904 Tour de France. In this Tour he finished fourth in the concluding Stage 6.

== See also ==
- List of cyclists in the 1904 Tour de France
