= Antoine Deflotrière =

French cyclist

Personal information
- Full name: Antoine Deflotrière
- Born: 11 August 1876 Tarare, France
- Died: 14 May 1934 (aged 57) Vienne, France

Cycling career
- Sport: Cycling
- Role: Rider

Antoine Deflotrière (11 August 1876 – 14 May 1934) was a French racing cyclist active in the early 1900s. He finished in last place in the 1904 Tour de France.
