= Brussels–Roubaix =

Cycling race from Belgium to France

Race details
- Region: Belgium and Northern France
- English name: Paris–Roubaix
- Local name(s): Brussels–Roubaix (in French); Bruxelles–Roubaix (in Dutch)
- Discipline: Road
- Type: One-day

History
- First edition: 1901
- Final edition: 1910
- First winner: Hippolyte Aucouturier (FRA)
- Final winner: René Vandenberghe (BEL)

Brussels–Roubaix was a cycling race held between Brussels, Belgium and Roubaix, France on three occasions in 1901, 1905 and 1910.

== Winners ==
Year	Country	Rider	Team
1901	France	Hippolyte Aucouturier	
1905	France	Louis Trousselier	
1910	Belgium	René Vandenberghe	
