= Saint-Genest-Malifaux =

- Commune
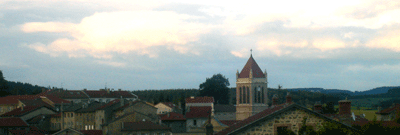

- Coat of arms
- Location of Saint-Genest-Malifaux
- Location within France Location within Auvergne-Rhône-Alpes
- Coordinates: 45°20′27″N 4°25′14″E
- Country: France
- Region: Auvergne-Rhône-Alpes
- Department: Loire
- Arrondissement: Saint-Étienne
- Canton: Le Pilat
- Intercommunality: Monts du Pilat

Government
  - Mayor (2020–2026): Vincent Ducreux
- Area^{1}: 47.08 km^{2} (18.18 sq mi)
- Elevation: 960 m (3,150 ft)
- Highest elevation: 1,292 m (4,239 ft)
- Lowest elevation: 680 m (2,230 ft)
- Population (2023): 2,921
  - Density: 62.04/km^{2} (160.7/sq mi)
- Time zone: UTC+01:00 (CET)
  - Summer (DST): UTC+02:00 (CEST)
- INSEE/Postal code: 42224 /42660
- ^{1} French Land Register data, which excludes lakes, ponds, glaciers > 1 km^{2} (0.386 sq mi or 247 acres) and river estuaries.

Saint-Genest-Malifaux (French pronunciation: [sɛ̃ ʒənɛ malifo]) is a small town in the Auvergne-Rhône-Alpes region of central France. Administratively it is designated a commune within the department of Loire.

== Population ==
Historical population

Year	Pop.	±% p.a.
1793	2,765	—
1821	2,711	−0.07%
1846	3,427	+0.94%
1872	2,344	−1.45%
1901	2,503	+0.23%
1926	2,521	+0.03%
1946	2,017	−1.11%
1962	1,769	−0.82%
1968	1,749	−0.19%

Year	Pop.	±% p.a.
1975	1,759	+0.08%
1982	2,199	+3.24%
1990	2,384	+1.01%
1999	2,691	+1.36%
2007	2,891	+0.90%
2012	2,918	+0.19%
2017	2,861	−0.39%
2023	2,921	+0.35%

Source: EHESS and INSEE (1968-2023)

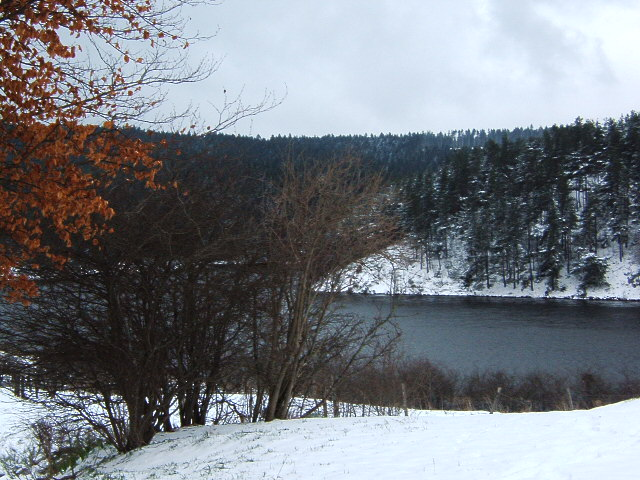
Lake at Saint-Genest-Malifaux

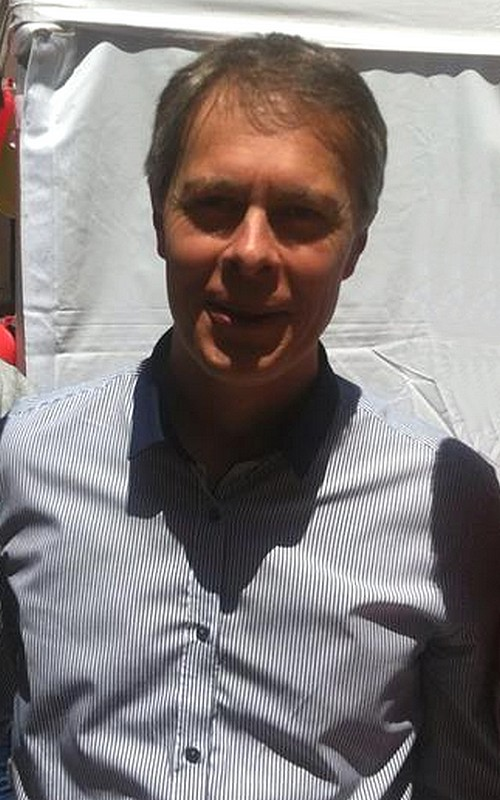
Mayor Vincent Ducreux, June 2013.

== See also ==
- Communes of the Loire department
