= Louis Coolsaet =

Belgian-French cyclist (1884-1941)

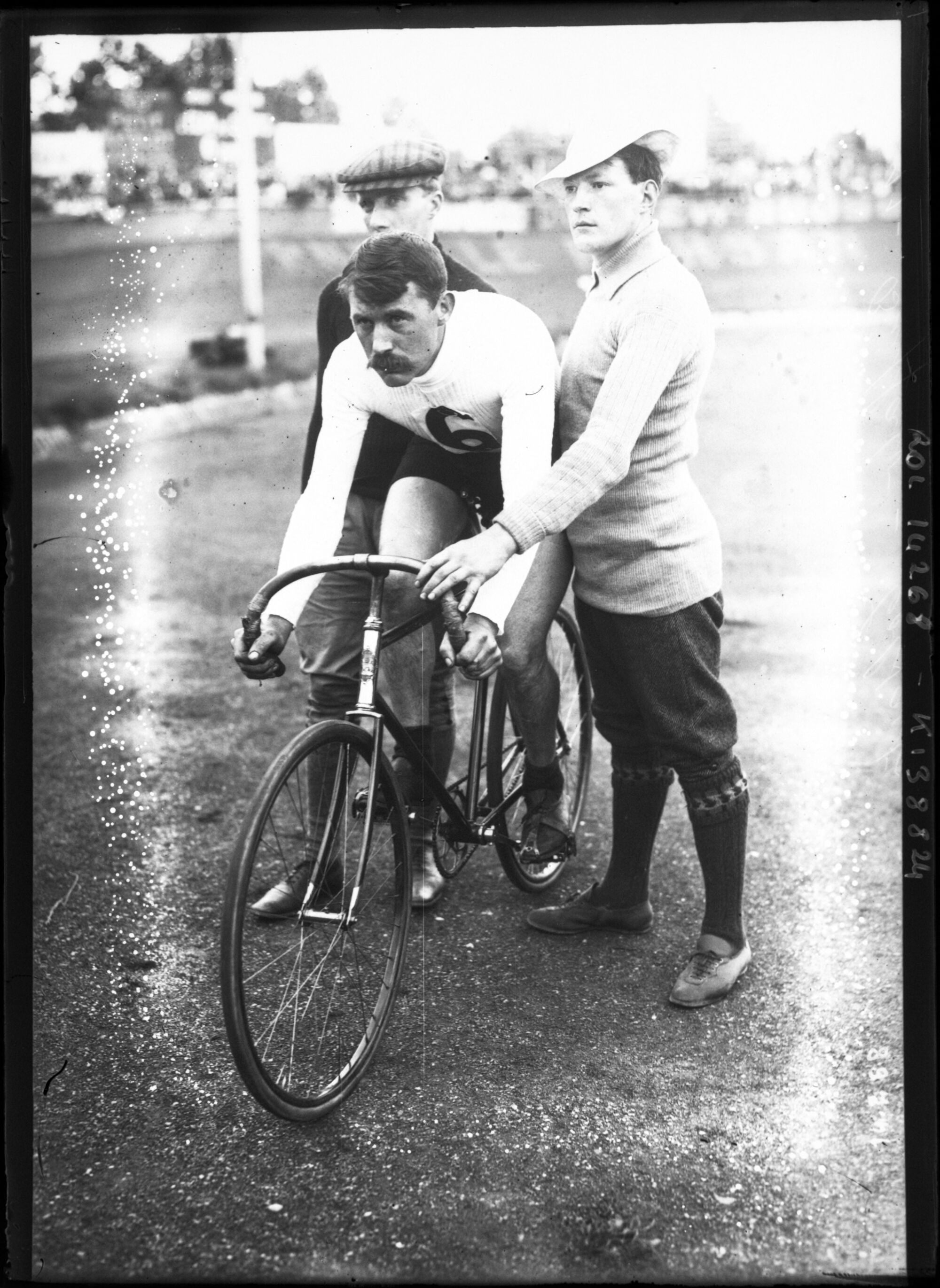
- Coolsaet in 1911

Personal information
- Full name: Louis Coolsaet
- Born: 21 November 1884 Tourcoing, France
- Died: 12 May 1941 (aged 56) Tourcoing, France
- Height: 172 cm (5 ft 8 in)
- Weight: 73 kg (161 lb)

Cycling career
- Sport: Cycling
- Discipline: Road
- Role: Rider

Louis Coolsaet (21 November 1884 – 12 May 1941) was a Belgian-French professional road racing cyclist.

== Biography ==
Coolsaet was born in 1884 in Tourcoing to Belgian parents. He lived in Waterloo, Belgium. He raced for Valante in 1904 and as an individual from 1905 to 1913. He participated in four editions of the Tour de France and was most notable for finishing 7th in the 1904 Tour de France. He was in this Tour one of the only four people who earned prize money.

He also competed in other main international cycling races achieving several top-10 results and won the bronze medal at the 1908 Flanders Road Race Championship. He finished among others tenth in the 1905 Paris-Roubaix and second overall in the Etoile Caroloregienne stage race, the predecessor of Grand Prix de Wallonie.

== Major results ==
1904
7th Overall 1904 Tour de France

6th Stage 6

1905
10th 1905 Paris-Roubaix

1908
(bronze) Flanders Road Cycling Championship

1910
9th Paris-Menin

1911
2nd Overall Etoile Caroloregienne (predecessor of Grand Prix de Wallonie)

4th Stage 1
5th Stage 2

1913
8th Stage 14 1913 Tour de France

=== General classification results timeline ===
Grand Tour general classification results
Race	1904	1905	1911	1912	1913
Tour de France	7th	—	24th	DNF (Stage 8)	21st
Major stage race general classification results
Tour of Belgium	—	—	12th	11th	DNF

Major Classic results
Monument	1904	1905	1911
Paris–Roubaix	14th	10th	18th
Classic	1904	1905	1911
Paris-Brussels	—	—	15th

Legend
—	Did not compete
DNF	Did not finish
