= Maurice Garin =

French cyclist (1871–1957)

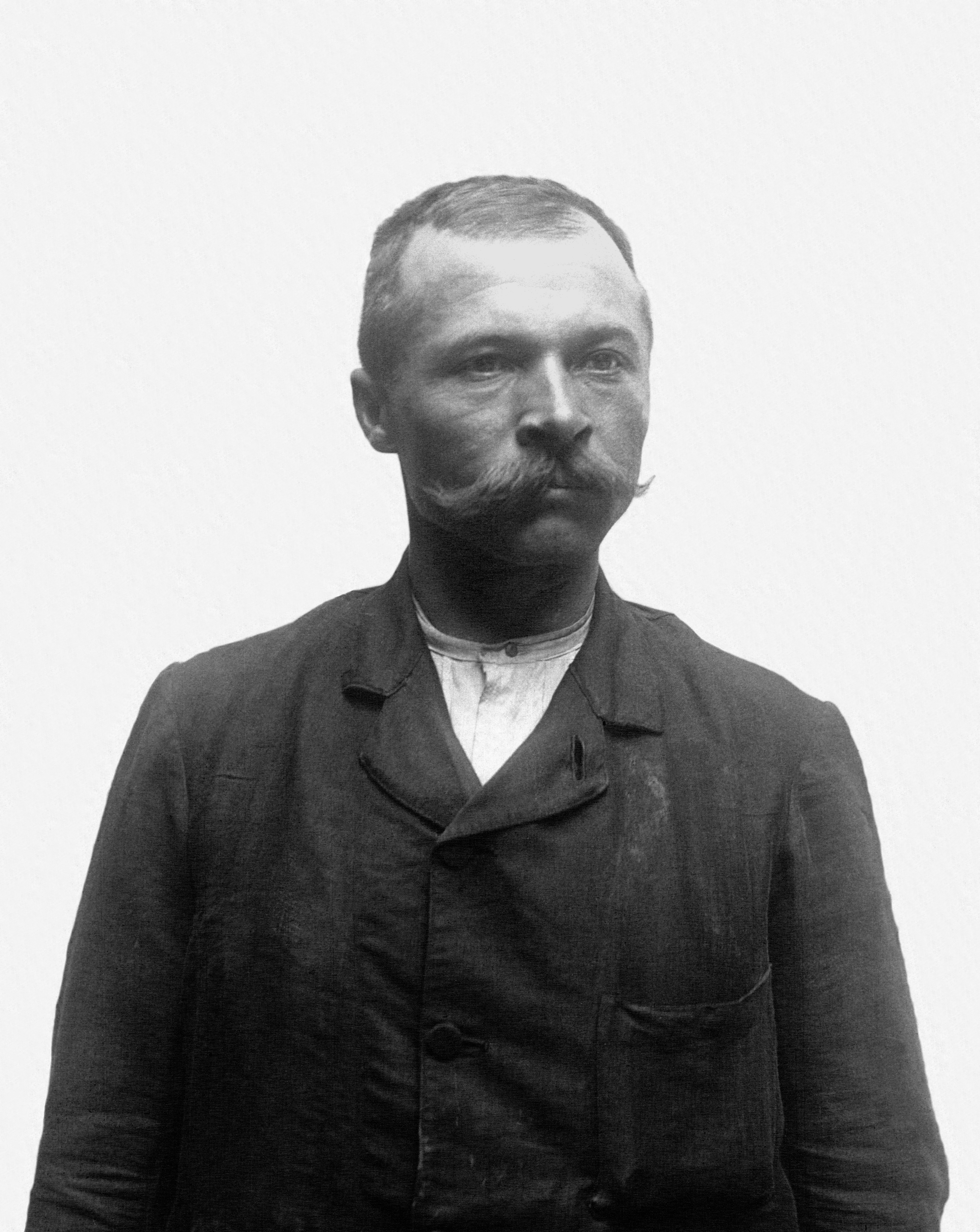

Personal information
- Full name: Maurice-François Garin
- Nicknames: Le petit ramoneur (The Little Chimney-sweep)
- Born: 3 March 1871 Arvier, Aosta Valley, Italy
- Died: 19 February 1957 (aged 85) Lens, France
- Height: 162 cm (5 ft 4 in)
- Weight: 60 kg (132 lb)

Cycling career
- Sport: Cycling
- Disciplines: Road and track
- Role: Rider
- Rider type: Distance rider

Amateur team
- 1892: Maubeuge cycling club

Professional teams
- 1893–1904: La Française
- 1911: La Française

Major wins
- Grand Tours Tour de France General classification (1903) 3 individual stages (1903) One-day races and Classics Paris–Roubaix (1897, 1898) Paris–Brest–Paris (1901) Bordeaux–Paris (1902)

Maurice-François Garin (pronounced [mɔʁis fʁɑ̃swa ɡaʁɛ̃, moʁ-]; 3 March 1871 – 19 February 1957) was an Italian-French road bicycle racer best known for winning the inaugural Tour de France in 1903, and for being stripped of his title in the second Tour in 1904 along with eight others, for cheating. He was of Italian origin but adopted French nationality on 21 December 1901.

== Family life ==
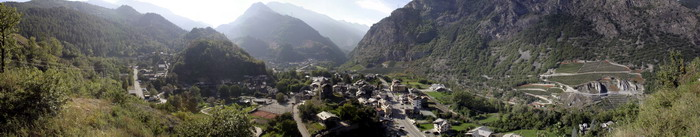
Arvier, in the Aosta Valley, the birthplace of Maurice Garin

Garin was born the son of Maurice-Clément Garin and Maria Teresa Ozello in Arvier, in the French-speaking Aosta Valley in north-west Italy, close to the French border. The Garin last name was the most common in the native frazione of Maurice, called "Chez-les-Garin", belonging to five of the seven families there. They had four daughters and five sons, of whom Maurice was the first son.

In 1885 the family left Arvier to work on the other side of the Alps, almost to the Belgian border.

Garin worked as a chimney sweep. He later moved to France. By the age of 15, he was living in Reims as a chimney sweep. He moved to Charleroi in Belgium but by 1889 he was back in France, at Maubeuge.

Garin's younger brother, Joseph-Isidore, died in 1889. The father died shortly afterwards in Arvier. Garin's brothers François and César stayed in northern France and, with Maurice, opened a cycle shop in the lower end of the boulevard de Paris in Roubaix in 1895. Brothers César and Ambroise also competed as professional cyclists.

Garin moved to Lens, Pas-de-Calais in 1902 and lived there the rest of his life. He bought his first bicycle for 405 francs, twice what a forge worker would earn in a week of 12-hour days, in 1889. Racing did not interest him but he did ride round the town fast enough to be called a madman – le fou.

Until 2004, it was said that Garin had taken French nationality when he was 21, in 1892 but in 2004, the reporter Franco Cuaz found the naturalizing act and Garin took French nationality 21 December 1901.

== Amateur racing ==
He began racing in northern France in the same year when the secretary of the cycling club at Maubeuge persuaded him to enter a regional race, Maubeuge-Hirson-Maubeuge, over 200 km. Garin finished fifth despite suffering from the sun and decided to ride more.

His first win was in 1893, in Namur-Dinant-Givet in Belgium. He had sold his first bike and bought a lighter one – still 16 kg but with pneumatic tyres – for 850 old French francs (approx €3,000 at 2008 values). The race was over 102 km. He was leading by Dinant when he punctured. Spotting a soigneur waiting with a spare bike for a rival, Garin rested his own against the wall of a bridge, grabbed the soigneur's spare bike and rode off. At the finish, winning with ten minutes over the field, he gave back the bike and recovered his own the next day where he had left it.

== Professional racing ==
Garin became a professional by chance. He planned to ride a race at Avesnes-sur-Helpes, 25 km from where he lived. He arrived to find it was only for professionals. Not allowed to compete, he waited until the riders had left, raced after them and passed them all. He fell off twice but finished ahead of the racers. The crowd was enthusiastic but the organisers less so. They refused to pay him the 150 francs (approx €525 at 2008 values) due to the real winner, so spectators raised 300 francs (approx €1,050 at 2008 values) among themselves. Garin became a professional.

His first true professional win was in a 24-hour race in Paris in 1893. (Note: Races at the time were largely of extremes, velodrome races being short sprints or paced behind motorcycles, road races becoming ever-longer trials of endurance which culminated in the Tour de France, which Garin won) It was held on the Champ de Mars, site of the Eiffel Tower. The riders competed, as was the custom, behind a succession of pacers. The event took place in February and the cold drove out riders one after the other. Garin rode 701 km in 24 hours, beating the only other rider to finish by 49 km. While other riders would consume much strong red wine, Garin chose a more apt diet, and said he had survived on:

- 19L hot chocolate
- 7L tea
- mixed champagne/coffee
- 5L tapioca
- 2 kg rice
- 45 cutlets
- 8 hardboiled eggs
- oysters

In 1894 he won a 24-hour race in Liège, Belgium, and the following year set an hour record for cycling behind pacers.

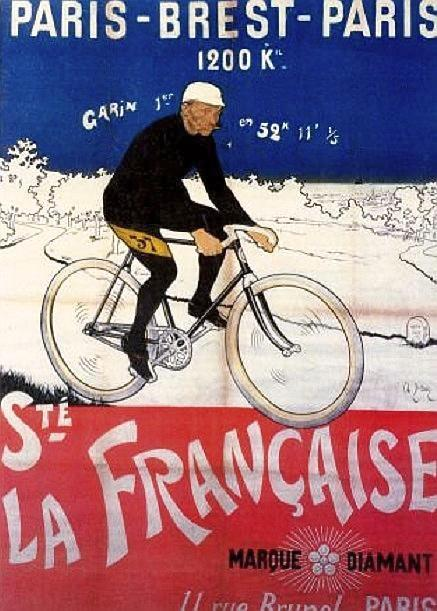
1901 Advertisement with Paris–Brest–Paris winner Maurice Garin for "La Française"

The first Paris–Roubaix was in 1896; Garin came third, 15 minutes behind Josef Fischer. He would have come second had he not been knocked over by a crash between two tandems, one of them ridden by his pacers. Garin "finished exhausted and Dr Butrille was obliged to attend the man who had been run over by two machines," said the race historian, Pascal Sergent.

In 1897 he won Paris–Roubaix, beating the Dutchman Mathieu Cordang in the last two kilometres of the velodrome at Roubaix. (Note: In 2004 Les Amis de Paris–Roubaix marked Garin's victories in the Paris–Roubaix event by placing a cobblestone – traditional trophy for winners of the race, on his grave. See Les Amis de Paris–Roubaix, Manifestations, 3rd Mars, 2004, Hommage à Maurice Garin) Sergent said:

As the two champions appeared they were greeted by a frenzy of excitement and everyone was on their feet to acclaim the two heroes. It was difficult to recognise them. Garin was first, followed by the mud-soaked figure of Cordang. Suddenly, to the stupefaction of everyone, Cordang slipped and fell on the velodrome's cement surface. Garin could not believe his luck. By the time Cordang was back on his bike, he had lost 100 metres. There remained six laps to cover. Two miserable kilometres in which to catch Garin. The crowd held its breath as they watched the incredible pursuit match. The bell rang out. One lap, there remained one lap. 333 metres for Garin, who had a lead of 30 metres on the Batave.

A classic victory was within his grasp but he could almost feel his adversary's breath on his neck. Somehow Garin held on to his lead of two metres, two little metres for a legendary victory. The stands exploded and the ovation united the two men. Garin exulted under the cheers of the crowd. Cordang cried bitter tears of disappointment.

In 1898 he won Paris–Roubaix again, this time by 20 minutes, and in 1901 he won the second edition of Paris–Brest–Paris, finishing almost two hours ahead of Gaston Rivierre after covering 1,208 km in 52h 11m 1s. He started by chasing another Frenchman, Lucien Lesna, who rode the first 600 km at 28 km/h and had two hours' lead at Brest. At Rennes he stopped for a bath to recover from the tiredness, filth and heat, then found he could not get racing again into the headwind. Garin passed him at Mayenne and Lesna gave up shortly afterwards with 200 km to go. Garin finished 19h 11m better than Charles Terront ten years earlier.

In 1902 Garin won Bordeaux–Paris, a race of 500 km from south-west France.

== Tour de France ==
=== 1903 Tour de France ===
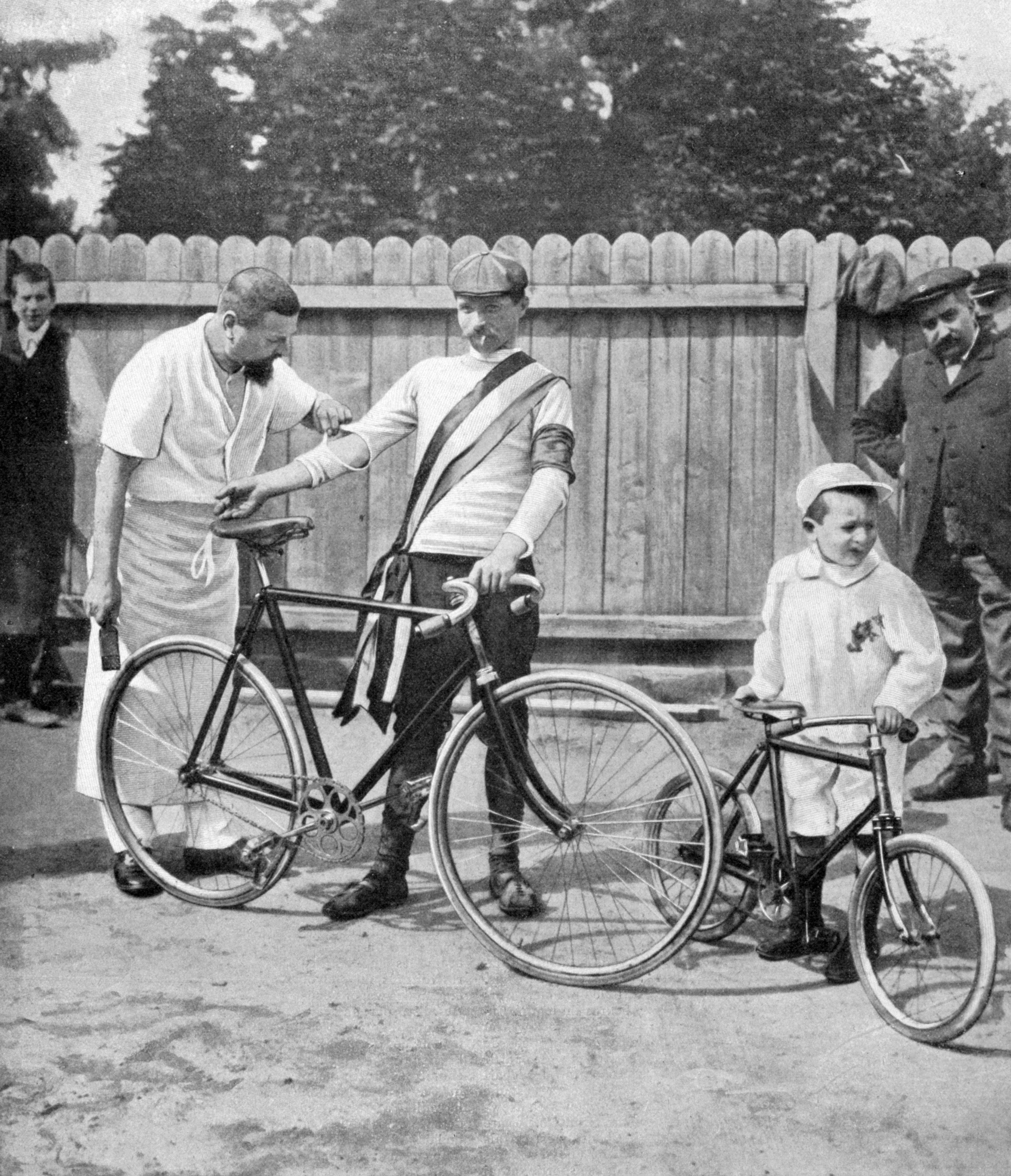
Garin with his masseur and son in 1903

The Tour de France was established to promote a new daily sports newspaper, L'Auto which was startted as a rival to the then largest paper in France, Le Vélo, which sold 80,000 copies a day. Some of Le Vélo's advertisers had disagreed with that paper's support for Alfred Dreyfus, an officer found guilty on trumped up charges of selling secrets to the Germans, who would be eventually acquitted after being long jailed on Devil's Island. The Tour was to promote their new anti-Dreyfus rival paper, L'Auto.

The editor, Henri Desgrange, planned a five-week race from 31 May to 5 July. This proved too daunting and only 15 entered. Desgrange cut the length to 19 days and offered a daily allowance.

The race began at the Au Reveil Matin café at a crossroads in Montgeron, south of Paris, and ended in Ville-d'Avray, another suburb, having circuited France in six days of racing over 2,428 km. One stage, between Nantes and Paris, was 471 km. Sixty riders started at an entry fee of 10 francs – €87.50 today with inflation – and 21 finished. Garin won 3,000 francs (approx €10,500 at 2008 values) for finishing first in 94h 33m 14s, or 6,125 francs (approx €21,500 at 2008 values) in all with his other prizes. Lucien Pothier was second and Fernand Augereau third.

Pierre Chany wrote:

In the town which adopted Maurice Garin, at Lens, an immense procession was organised with the participation of all the notables of the region. Before leaving Paris on Monday evening, the day after the race finished, the winner paid a visit, out of politeness, to Henri Desgrange and, in a gesture without precedent, pulled a sheet of paper from his pocket. It was an article 'in order to simplify the interview', he explained! There he gave his feelings during the race, gave his opinion on the formula by which the race was run, gave a word of congratulation to his rivals.

Garin's written note said:

The 2,500 km that I've just ridden seem a long line, grey and monotonous, where nothing stood out from anything else. But I suffered on the road; I was hungry, I was thirsty, I was sleepy, I suffered, I cried between Lyon and Marseille, I had the pride of winning other stages, and at the controls I saw the fine figure of my friend Delattre, who had prepared my sustenance, but I repeat, nothing strikes me particularly.

But wait! I'm completely wrong when I say that nothing strikes me, I'm confusing things or explaining myself badly. I must say that one single thing struck me, that a single thing sticks in my memory: I see myself, from the start of the Tour de France, like a bull pierced by banderillas, (Note: Banderillas – the spears used to aggravate animals in a bull-fight) who pulls the banderillas with him, never able to rid himself of them.

=== 1904 Tour de France ===
Of the 1904 race, Edward Boeglin asked:
Was Garin the subject of an injustice? It's not impossible. But the rigour of the sanctions can be explained by the discredit into which professional cycling had (already!) fallen. An example had to be made of a champion.
Garin was incontestably the strongest rider of the period, so he was first choice. He was 34. The suspension for two years ... broke his career. We never again saw him at the front of the peloton 'this little and stubborn rider of formidable consistency ... who won all the races that mattered',
... "this rider, intelligent, crafty, instinctive and calculating,
... the little chimney sweep from Arvier, in the Aoste valley near Mont Blanc'

— Edouard Boeglin, Franco Cuaz.

Garin also won the 1904 Tour de France, by a small margin over Lucien Pothier, but was subsequently stripped of the title which was awarded to Henri Cornet. The race aroused a passion among spectators, who felled trees to hold back rivals and beat up others at night outside St-Étienne. Garin was one of the mob's victims. Pierre Chany wrote:

In the climb of the col de la République, leaving St-Étienne, supporters of the regional rider, Faure, assault the Italian, Gerbi. He is thrown to the ground, beaten like plaster. He escapes with a broken finger...

... A bunch of fanatics wielded sticks and shouted insults, setting on the other riders: Maurice and César Garin got a succession of blows, the older brother [Maurice] was hit in the face with a stone. Soon there was general mayhem: "Up with Faure! Down with Garin! Kill them!" they were shouting. Finally cars arrived and the riders could get going thanks to pistol shots. The aggressors disappeared into the night.

Garin said: "I'll win the Tour de France provided I'm not murdered before we get to Paris."

Misbehaviour was rife too between riders and nine were thrown out during the race for, among other things, riding in or being pulled by cars. There were claims, too, that the organisers had allowed Garin to break rules – at one stage being given food where it was not permitted by its chief official – because his sponsor, La Française, had a financial stake in the race.

The French cycling union, the Union Vélocipédique Française, heard from dozens of competitors and witnesses and in December disqualified all the stage winners and the first four finishers: Garin, Pothier, César Garin, and Hippolyte Aucouturier. The UVF did not say precisely what had happened and the details were lost when Tour archives were transported south in 1940 to avoid the German invasion and never seen again. Stories spread of riders spreading tacks on the road to delay rivals with punctures, of riders being poisoned by each other or by rival fans. Lucien Petit-Breton said he complained to an official that he had seen a rival hanging on to a motorcycle, only to have the cheating rider pull out a revolver.

Tales were also said to include 'Garin taking a train', a claim confirmed by a cemetery attendant looking after his grave who, as a boy, heard Garin tell his stories as an old man. In December 1904 Garin was stripped of his title and banned for two years.

== Retirement ==
Garin retired from cycling and ran his garage in Lens until his death. The garage is still there, although wholly changed from Garin's era. An unnamed writer recalled:

I remember Maurice Garin well. I met him and talked to him almost every day because we lived in the same area, 200 m from each other, at Lens. Le Père Garin, as my father and grandfather called him (Note: Père – father – is a dated mark of respect) used to bring out a chair in fine weather and sit in the doorway of the little office of the service station he owned at 116 rue de Lille in Lens, under the sign for Antar fuel and oil. My barber was in the neighbouring house and I used to go there once a month to have a crew cut, [couper en brosse] which was the fashion in those days. My friends and I were aged seven to ten and on our one-speed bikes we used to pin numbers on our back... and we never missed riding past Maurice Garin in a tight group so that he would see. It's strange that nobody thought to take a picture of me, the little kid, alongside the first great champion of the biggest race in the world. But life's like that.

Maurice Garin was far from an adulated hero, even less a rich champion (he spent his retirement running the service station), and I don't remember any special celebration in his honour. Television crews didn't come from home and abroad to interview him. [They showed no interest] until he died in 1957. And the rue de Lille, where he lived, still hasn't been renamed the rue Maurice Garin.

Garin kept his interest in cycling. He returned just once to his birthplace, in 1949, to see the Tour pass through. He began a professional team under his name after the Second World War. The Dutchman Piet van Est won Bordeaux–Paris in 1950 and 1952 in the team's red and white jersey. On the Tour's 50th anniversary in 1953, Garin was among several old stars waiting at the finish as part of a celebration.

== Death and commemoration ==
He is buried in a family grave with his wife Desirée. The inscription on the headstone says:

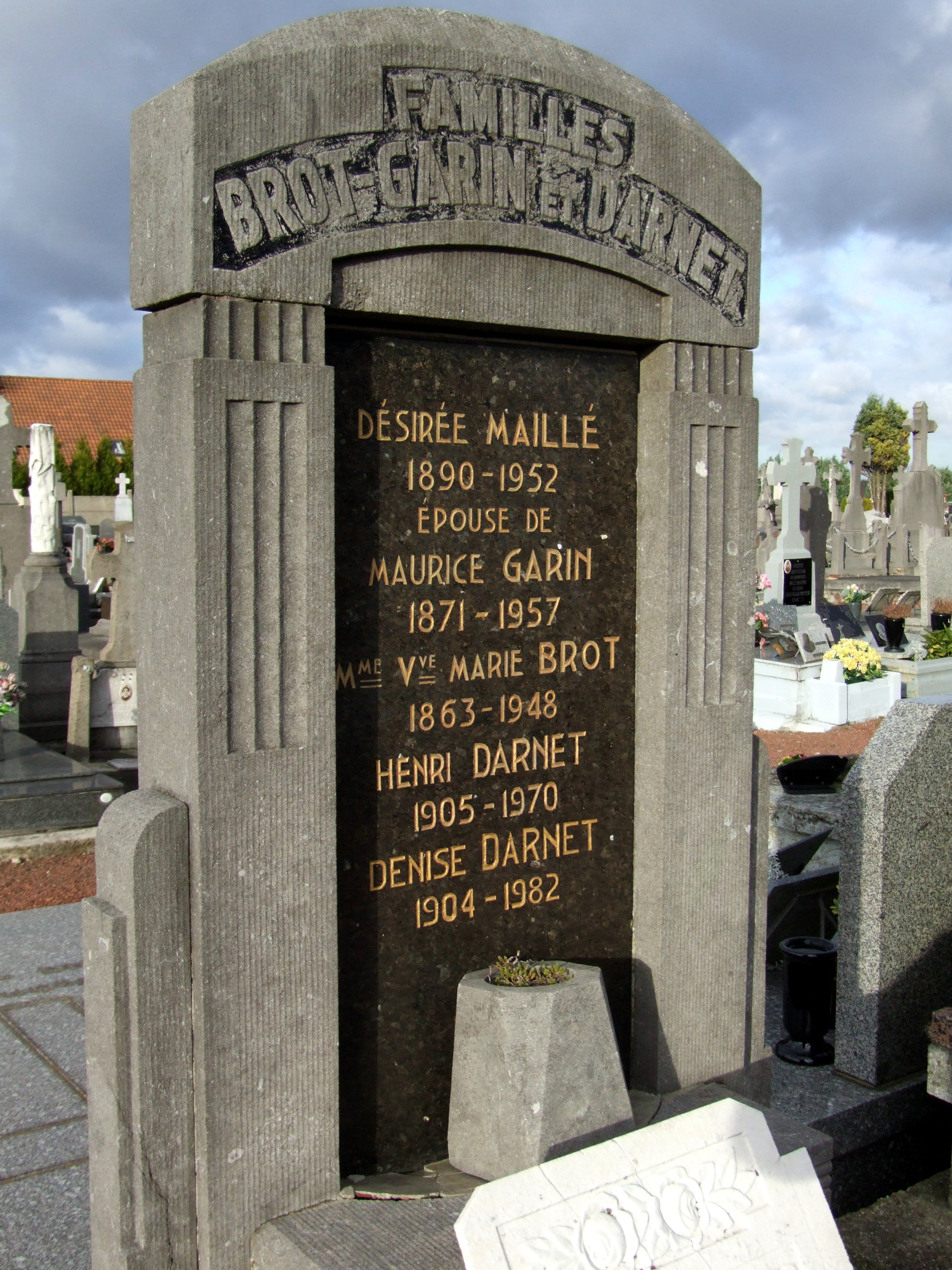

Familles Brot, Garin et Darnet.
Desirée Maille (1890–1952),
— Épouse de
Maurice Garin (1871–1957)
Mme Vve Marie Brot, (1863–1948)
Henri Darnet (1905–1970)
Denise Darnet (1904–1982)

— 'Cimetière Est' (section F3), Sallaumines, near Lens

In 1933 the Stade Vélodrome Maurice Garin was built in Lens, and named in his honour. (Note: The "Stade Vélodrome Maurice Garin" was razed and rebuilt in 1990, and re-opened by the Minister of Youths and Sports Roger Bambuck. It was again due for demolition in 2007 as part of the 'Lens Louvre' reconstruction project)

In 1938 Garin was awarded the gold medal of Physical Education by the Minister of Sport for France, Leo Lagrange.

Garin is remembered as a short, determined man, even authoritarian. As an old man he became confused. His biographer, Franco Cuaz, said:

... He [Garin] wandered through Lens asking "Where is the control? Where is the control?" as his mind brought back images of the hotels where riders signed check sheets in the first Tours.

... He regularly ended up at the town's police station, from where he was escorted back home. Often he was far from home, without knowing where he was or where he was going.

In 2003 a street was named after him in Maubeuge on the 100th anniversary of his 1903 win in the Tour de France.

In 2004 Les Amis de Paris–Roubaix placed a cobblestone on his grave, a traditional trophy for winners of the Paris–Roubaix race.

In Arvier, the village in Italy where he was born, there is a monument in his honour. His biographer, Franco Cuaz, said: "Every year, the municipality sends me French people who want to see the house where he was born. It's like a pilgrimage."

== Career achievements ==
Source: Maurice Garin at Cycling Archives (archive)

=== Major results ===
1893
Dinant-Namur-Dinant
Paris 80km (vélodrome)
1894
Liège 24hr (vélodrome)
Paris-Saint-Malo
1895
24hr Arts libéraux de Paris (vélodrome)
Guingamp-Morlaix-Guingamp
World record 500km behind human pacer on the road 15h 2m 32s
1896
Paris-Le Mans
Paris-Mons
Liège-Thuin
3rd Paris–Roubaix
1897
Paris–Roubaix
Paris-Royan
Paris-Cabourg
Tourcoing-Béthune-Tourcoing
1898
Paris–Roubaix
Tourcoing-Béthune-Tourcoing
Valenciennes-Nouvion-Valenciennes
Douai-Doullens-Douai
50km Ostend (vélodrome)
2nd Bordeaux–Paris
1899
3rd Bordeaux–Paris
3rd Bol d'Or (vélodrome)
1900
2nd Bordeaux–Paris
2nd d Bol d'Or
3rd Paris–Roubaix
1901
Paris–Brest–Paris
1902
Bordeaux–Paris
1903
Tour de France

Winner overall classification (Note: The yellow jersey image is symbolic, it was not used in the Tour de France before either 1913 or 1919. Garin wore a green armband.)
Winner 3 stages

=== Grand Tour general classification results timeline ===
Grand Tour	1903	1904
Tour de France	1	DSQ
Giro d'Italia	N/A	N/A
Vuelta a España	N/A	N/A

Legend
1	Winner
2–3	Top three-finish
4–10	Top ten-finish
11–	Other finish
DNE	Did not enter
DNF-x	Did not finish (retired on stage x)
DNS-x	Did not start (not started on stage x)
HD-x	Finished outside time limit (occurred on stage x)
DSQ	Disqualified
N/A	Race/classification not held
NR	Not ranked in this classification
