= Philippe Jousselin =

French cyclist (1872–1927)

Personal information
- Born: 16 April 1872 Angoulême, France
- Died: 29 April 1927 (aged 55) Cognac, France

Cycling career
- Sport: Cycling
- Discipline: Road
- Role: Rider

Professional team
- 1904: La Française

Philippe Jousselin (16 April 1872 – 29 April 1927) was a French professional road racing cyclist active in the early 20th century. He rode for the team La Française. He was most known for finishing seventh overall in the 1904 Tour de France.

== Career ==
In 1904, Jousselin started the second edition of the Tour de France. He initially finished seventh overall. However, half a year later on 30 November 1904 he was disqualified due to rule violations. He was not the only one among the 88 participants to resort to such tactics. Chevalier's disqualification was part of a broader issue with many other competitors facing similar charges, leading to long-term suspensions and a reevaluation of how the Tour was organized. The race was ultimately seen as a chaotic and corrupt event and Jousselin's involvement in the scandal marked a dark chapter in the early history of the Tour de France.

== See also ==
- List of cyclists in the 1904 Tour de France
