= Auguste Daumain =

French cyclist (1877–1938)

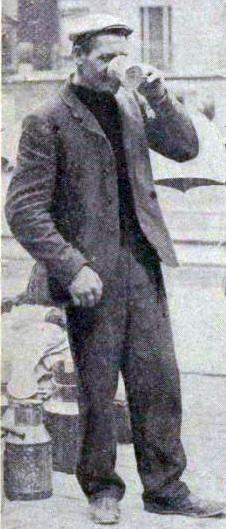
- Daumain in 1904.

Personal information
- Full name: Auguste Moïse Daumain
- Born: July 31, 1877 Selles-sur-Cher, Loir-et-Cher, France
- Died: December 7, 1938 (aged 61) Santiago de Chile, Chile

Cycling career
- Sport: Cycling
Medal record
Men's track cycling
Representing France
Olympic Games
Bronze medal – third place	1900 Paris	25 kilometres

Auguste Moïse Daumain (1877-1938) was a French racing cyclist who competed in the late 19th century and early 20th century. He participated in Cycling at the 1900 Summer Olympics in Paris and won the bronze medal in the men's 25 kilometre race. In the men's sprint, he finished third in the second heat and third in the fourth heat in the quarterfinals.

In the 1904 Tour de France, he finished sixth at the general classification.
