= Josef Fischer (cyclist) =

German cyclist

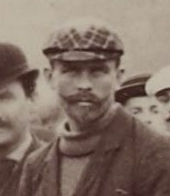
- Fischer at the start of the 1896 Paris–Roubaix

Personal information
- Full name: Josef Fischer
- Born: 20 January 1865 Cham, Kingdom of Bavaria
- Died: 3 March 1953 (aged 88) Munich, Germany

Cycling career
- Sport: Cycling
- Current team: Retired
- Discipline: Road
- Role: Rider

Professional team
- 1892–1904: –

Major wins
- Paris–Roubaix (1896); Bordeaux–Paris (1900)

Josef Fischer (20 January 1865 – 3 March 1953) was a German road bicycle racer. He is best known for winning the first edition of Paris–Roubaix in 1896 and Bordeaux–Paris in 1900.

After his retirement from active cycling, Fischer initially stayed in Paris, working as a chauffeur for noble customers. During the First World War he had to leave France and returned to Germany.

== Major results ==
1893
1st, Vienna–Berlin
1896
1st, Paris–Roubaix
1899
2nd, Bordeaux–Paris
1900
1st, Bordeaux–Paris
2nd, Paris–Roubaix
1903
15th, Tour de France
