= Henri Paret (cyclist, born 1854) =

French cyclist

Personal information
- Born: 1854 Saint-Étienne, France
- Died: Unknown

Cycling career
- Sport: Cycling
- Discipline: Road
- Role: Rider

Henri Paret (1854–1943) was a French cyclist. He is notable for being the oldest cyclist to ever ride in the Tour de France, riding the 1904 Tour de France at age 50. He finished in 11th place in the race.
