= Émile Lombard (cyclist) =

Belgian cyclist

Personal information
- Full name: Émile Lombard
- Born: Unknown

Cycling career
- Sport: Cycling
- Discipline: Road
- Role: Rider

Professional team
- 1904: Bary

Major wins
- Leading general classification Tour de France for one day

Émile Lombard (Liège) was a Belgian professional road bicycle racer, who raced the 1904 Tour de France. During the race, after the second stage, Lombard was in 4th place. Because that year's race was filled with disqualifications because riders were accused of taking trains, in November 1904 it was decided that several players were disqualified, including the three cyclists that were standing above Lombard after the second stage, and as a result Lombard had been leading the general classification for one day.

== Palmarès ==
1902
Belgium amateur road race championship
