= Michel Frédérick =

Swiss cyclist (1872–1912)

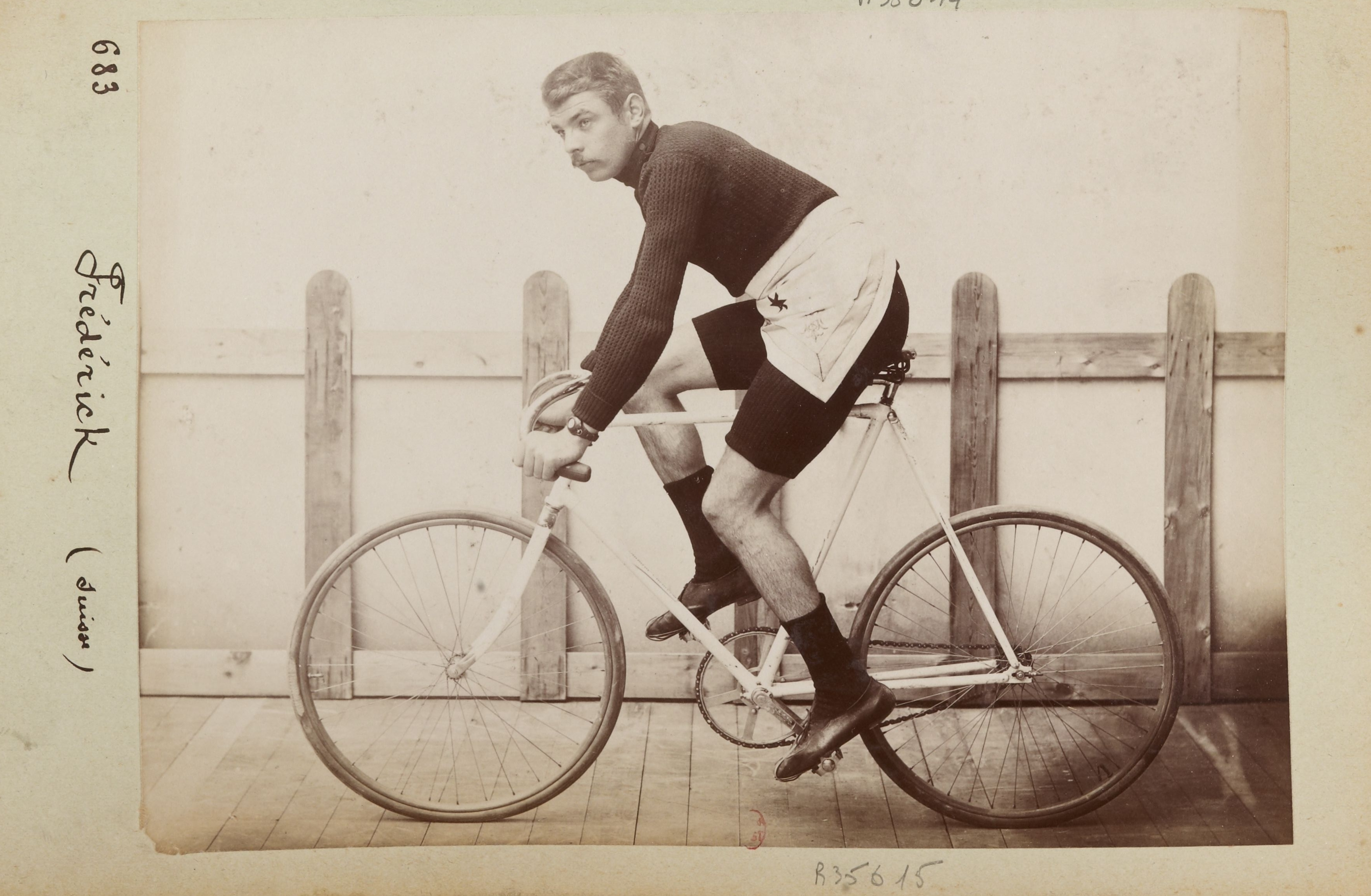

Personal information
- Full name: Michel Frédérick
- Nickname: Tollim
- Born: 6 November 1872 Zürich, Switzerland
- Died: 22 June 1912 (aged 39) Nice, France

Cycling career
- Sport: Cycling
- Discipline: Road
- Role: Rider

Major wins
- 1 stage Tour de France

Michel Frédérick (6 November 1872 – 22 June 1912) was a Swiss professional road bicycle racer, who won the first stage of the 1904 Tour de France, and was leading the classification for one day, the second non-French person to do so after Charles Laeser in the 1903 Tour de France. Because the 1904 Tour de France was filled with many disqualifications because cyclists were accused of taking the train, his stage victory was not acknowledged until months after the race. He dropped to 14th position on the second stage, and did not appear on the starting line for the third stage.

Frédérick was born in Zürich. Early in his career, he finished 3rd in the Paris–Roubaix and 2nd in the Bordeaux–Paris. He died, aged 39, at Nice.

== Major results ==
1904
Tour de France

Winner stage 1
