= Aloïs Catteau =

Belgian cyclist

- Catteau in 1911

Personal information
- Full name: Aloïs Catteau
- Born: 11 August 1877 Tourcoing, France
- Died: 2 November 1939 (aged 62) Menen, Belgium

Cycling career
- Sport: Cycling
- Discipline: Road
- Role: Rider

Aloïs Catteau (11 August 1877 – 2 November 1939) was an early-twentieth-century Belgian road racing cyclist who participated in the inaugural 1903 Tour de France and finished tenth. His best result was the 1904 Tour de France, where he finished 3rd.

== Major results ==
1903
10th Overall Tour de France
1904
3rd Overall Tour de France
6th Paris–Roubaix
1905
7th Paris–Roubaix
1906
3rd Paris–Tourcoing
6th Overall Tour de France
1907
9th Overall Tour de France
1908
7th Overall Tour of Belgium
8th Paris-Bruxelles
1909
6th Bol d'Or
1911
6th Bol d'Or

=== Grand Tour general classification results timeline ===
Grand Tour	1903	1904	1905	1906	1907	1908	1909	1910	1911
Giro d'Italia	Did not Exist						—	—	—
Tour de France	10	3	11	6	9	21	—	—	DNF

Legend
—	Did not compete
DNF	Did not finish
