= Antoine Fauré =

French cyclist

Personal information
- Full name: Antoine Fauré
- Born: 24 December 1883 Lyon, France
- Died: 9 September 1954 (aged 70) Dijon, France

Cycling career
- Sport: Cycling
- Discipline: Road
- Role: Rider

Antoine Fauré (24 December 1883 – 9 September 1954) was a French road bicycle racer. He rode the Tour de France two times in 1909 and 1912. He only finished in 1909, when he came 37th.
