= Hippolyte Aucouturier =

French cyclist (1876–1944)

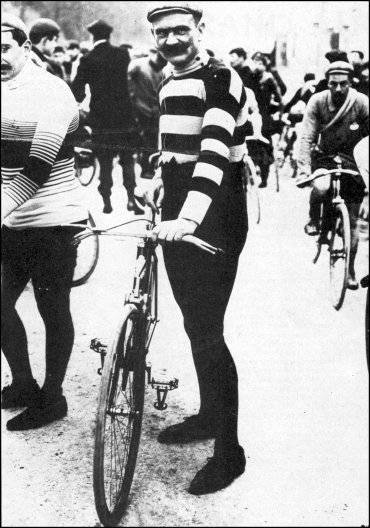
- Aucouturier in 1903

Personal information
- Full name: Hippolyte Aucouturier
- Nickname: Le Terrible (The Terrible)
- Born: 17 October 1876 La Celle, France
- Died: 22 April 1944 (aged 67) Paris, France

Cycling career
- Sport: Cycling
- Discipline: Road
- Role: Rider

Professional team
- 1900–1908: Individual

Major wins
- Grand Tours Tour de France 5 individual stages (1903, 1905) One-day races and Classics Paris–Roubaix (1903, 1904) Brussels–Roubaix (1901) Bordeaux–Paris (1903, 1905)

Hippolyte Aucouturier (17 October 1876 – 22 April 1944) was a French professional road bicycle racer. Aucouturier, a professional between 1900 and 1908, won two stages at the first Tour de France in 1903 and won three stages and finished second in the 1905 Tour de France. He also won Paris–Roubaix twice, in 1903 and 1904. His elder brother Francois was also a racing cyclist.

Aucouturier was an outspoken man whom the Tour organiser, Henri Desgrange, referred to in L'Auto as Le Terrible.

== 1903 Paris–Roubaix ==
The 1903 Paris–Roubaix, on 11 April, was decided when Aucouturier organised a chase to bring back a group which had escaped on the côte de St-Germain. Aucouturier took up the pursuit on the way to Pontoise, taking with him Louis Trousselier and others. They caught the fugitives and a new group formed on the côte d'Ennery. Aucouturier, recovered from typhoid the previous year, tested the group repeatedly before Doullens. He entered the velodrome at Roubaix alongside Claude Chapperon, 50 metres ahead of the others.

Tradition had it that riders changed bikes at the entrance to the stadium, taking specialist track bikes to ride the three laps of the velodrome to the finish. Bikes waited for all the remaining riders and Chapperon mistakenly took Trousselier's machine. In the time it took him to realise his error and change to his own bicycle, Aucouturier passed him and took a 100m lead to win.

== 1903 Tour de France ==
Aucouturier came to the Tour de France having won Paris–Roubaix. Speculation was that he and another prominent rider, Maurice Garin, would fight out the race between them. The paper published their picture and that of the German, Joseph Fischer on its front page on 1 July 1903. But Aucouturier abandoned after La Palisse, 320 km into the first stage, with stomach cramp said to be brought on by drinking too much. Nobody now knows if this means what it says, perhaps from unclean water, or if referred to drinking wine and sniffing ether, both aimed at numbing the pain of long days riding on bad roads with little food. The previous year he had had typhoid fever and he may not have recovered.

The historian Pierre Chany, wrote:

The big athlete in his blue and red jersey collapsed on a chair. He was crying and tears ran down the pink creases in his dusty face.

"I've never felt like this before. My will is strong [La tête est bonne], my legs are good, but I'm not making progress. My stomach is in a bad state."

"Your stomach?", asked Géo Lefèvre.

"Yes. It's finished, finished", Aucouturier replied.

"Allons! Allons! Eat and you'll feel better", Géo Lefèvre said.

He ate, he stood up, clenched his hands and slowly took hold of his machine. Poor beaten champion. The robust Hippolyte brought to ground by stomach pain, abandoned at La Palisse, 135km from the finish.

Géo Lefèvre insisted the cause was food poisoning.

La Palisse, 2 July. Aucouturier has abandoned the race at La Palisse, telling me he could no longer continue the battle, that he had abominable stomach cramp caused by bad food. I followed Garin and Pagie from Nevers station to La Palisse, in other words all through the night... I saw Aucouturier demoralised at Moulins and he dropped out at La Palisse and he is now, it seems, in bed in his hotel, in a feverish sleep. The poor man has been beaten by his stomach... Lack of care has killed him. I'd foreseen Aucouturier's weakening [effondrement], but I thought it would have happened a lot further on. Brave Aucouturier! Your dream of glory has flown. Prepare your revenge!

The rules allowed a rider who dropped out to start again next morning, but to compete for daily victories and not for the overall result. Aucouturier won the second stage, 374 km from Lyon to Marseille in 14h 28m, and the following stage from Marseille to Toulouse, 423 km in 13h 19m. He left the race for good the following day, racing to Bordeaux, when he crashed in Moissac.

Aucouturier reached Paris, but not by bike. Lefèvre met him there:

His crash... while not serious, troubles him a lot. He has one leg wrapped in a thick bandage and the poor boy limps markedly. His unhappiness at not having been able to ride the race right to the end, to have abandoned it on the first stage, is without limit. A victory in the first Tour de France wouldn't have crowned his sporting career, because he still has long years in front of him, but it would have been his greatest glory. Console yourself, brave Aucouturier. Perhaps you will win the second Tour de France?

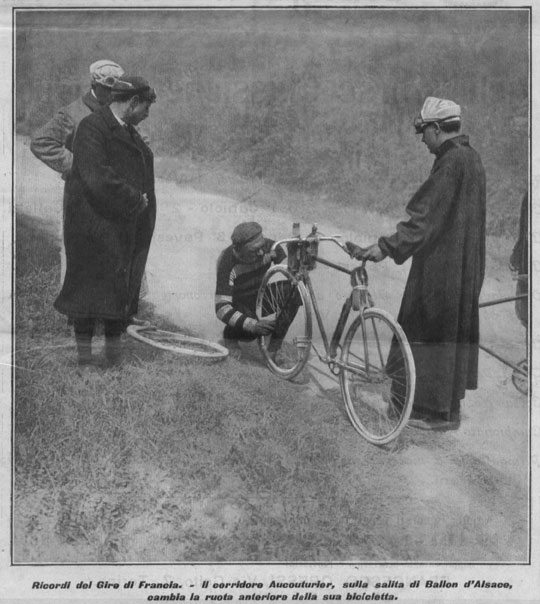
Hippolyte Aucouturier on the Ballon d'Alsace 1906

== 1904 Paris–Roubaix ==
The Paris–Roubaix of 1904 was the first to be run without pacers. Until then, riders had been sheltered by tandems of two and three riders. Aucouturier, rider number 15, was in the leading group when the race reached the first signing-in point at Pontoise. The second check was at Beauvais, 49 km later. Race historian Pascal Sergent said:

The crowd had started gathering outside the Café Potard, site of the control, from 6am. The leading group had been reduced to nine: Acouturier, Samson, Lepoutre, Chapperon, Wattelier, Pagie and Pothier. The nine riders came into town and the moment they saw the Café Potard, a sprint broke out. Machines were thrown to the ground. Everyone rushed to be first to sign the register and to get away quickly. Tussles broke out over the pen-holder which sometimes disappeared, more or less intentionally, during the torment.

Aucouturier was alone in the lead by early afternoon. Behind him in the rain, César Garin was catching him little by little until at Lens there was less than a minute between them. The two came together with 45 km to go. Garin fell when a car carrying journalists from La Vie au Grand Air ran into him. But the two were still together at Roubaix and raced on to the track to the cheers of a scant crowd. They had ridden so fast that only 20 people had arrived in time and judges from L'Auto arrived only just before the finish. Until their arrival, there had been no judge at the finish line. Aucouturier and Garin slowed to a tactical crawl, each watching the other. Then Aucouturier sprinted away to win by two lengths.

== 1904 Tour de France ==
Aucouturier was one of the four leading riders disqualified at the end in a race so chaotic that Henri Desgrange swore he would never run another. The Tour had been bedevilled by protesters, some of whom attacked riders, and by trees felled across the road. So frequent were accusations of cheating among riders, including claims that some had taken a train, that on 30 November 1904 the Union Vélocipédique de France disqualified Maurice Garin, Lucien Pothier, César Garin and Aucouturier, who had taken the first four places. Victory went to Henri Cornet, the youngest rider to win.

== 1905 Tour de France ==
In 1905 he won the stage from Nancy to Besançon (299 km in 10h 11m), from Grenoble to Toulon (348 km in 13h 19m), and Bordeaux to La Rochelle (247 km in 8h 25m). He came second overall.

== Major results ==
1901
1st, Brussels–Roubaix
2nd, Bordeaux–Paris
3rd, Paris–Brest–Paris
1903
1st, Paris–Roubaix
1st, Bordeaux–Paris
Tour de France

1st, Stage 2, Marseille
1st, Stage 3, Toulouse

2nd, Paris–Valenciennes
1904
1st, Paris–Roubaix
1905
1st, Bordeaux–Paris
2nd, Overall, Tour de France

1st, Stage 2, Besançon
1st, Stage 4, Toulon
1st, Stage 8, La Rochelle
3rd, Stage 11, Paris
