= Henri Cornet =

French cyclist

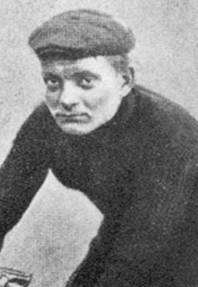

Personal information
- Full name: Henri Cornet
- Nickname: Le rigolo (The joker)
- Born: 4 August 1884 Desvres, France
- Died: 18 March 1941 (aged 56) Prunay-le-Gillon, France

Cycling career
- Sport: Cycling
- Discipline: Road
- Role: Rider

Professional teams
- 1904–1905: Cycles JC
- 1906: Unknown
- 1907: Griffon
- 1908: Peugeot – Wolber
- 1909: Nil – Supra
- 1910–1912: Le Globe – Dunlop

Major wins
- Grand Tours Tour de France General classification (1904) 1 individual stage (1904) One-day races and Classics Paris–Roubaix (1906)

Henri Cornet (French: [ɑ̃ʁi kɔʁnɛ]; born Henri Jardry; 4 August 1884 – 18 March 1941) was a French cyclist who won the 1904 Tour de France. He is its youngest winner, just short of his 20th birthday.

== Background ==
Cornet was born in the Pas-de-Calais region of northwest France and was registered at birth under his mother's name. Then he was adopted by his stepfather, who gave him the name Jardry. It is not known why he changed his name from Henri Jardry to Henri Cornet. He was a talented amateur—he won Paris-Honfleur in 1903—but little known beyond northern France and in Belgium when he entered the second Tour de France in 1904. It was his first year as a professional. The organizer, Henri Desgrange, promoted his unknown competitors to readers of L'Auto, the newspaper he edited, by giving them nicknames. He called Cornet Le Rigolo, or "the joker", for his sense of fun. He is described as cheerful, with wide-spaced eyes, a nose described as trumpet-like, and a generous mouth that spread easily into a smile.

== Tour de France ==
The Tour de France had proved a success when the first race was run in 1903 and both the competition between riders and the passion of the fans who supported them rose to sometimes dangerous proportions. Riders took trains and lifts in cars or had themselves towed by drivers; a rider called Pierre Chevalier was repeatedly left exhausted in the darkness of night only to reappear in the race; the 1903 winner, Maurice Garin received food from the race director, Géo Lefèvre when others were denied. Fans beat up riders on the col de la République outside St-Étienne and dispersed only when Garin fired his gun.

Other spectators threw nails on the road on the last day and Cornet rode the last 40 km on flat tires. After many complaints about widespread cheating, the top four finishers were disqualified by the French cycling union. It declared Cornet the winner although he had taken three hours more than Garin, the winner and receiving an official warning that suggests his own conduct was less than pristine. Desgrange said he would never run the race again.

Cornet is the Tour's youngest winner at 19 years, 355 days.

== After 1904 ==
Henri Cornet never had further success in the Tour, dropping out in 1905 on the fourth day. He won Paris–Roubaix and came second in Bordeaux–Paris in 1906, and came eighth in the 1908 Tour de France, in which he won a one-lap time-trial held at the end of the race in the Parc des Princes. It was a demonstration race and did not count for the overall result of the Tour.

He was known for his ability to perform repeated short efforts.

== Retirement and death ==
Cornet rode his last Tour de France in 1912, finishing 28th. He had repeated health problems, however, which brought his career to an end. He stopped racing with the start of World War I. He retired to work in the cycle business (négoce cycliste) and died after a hospital operation at 56. A road in Prunay-le-Gillon is named after him.

== Career achievements ==
=== Major results ===
1904
1904 Tour de France:

Winner overall classification
Winner stage 3

1906
Paris–Roubaix

=== Grand Tour general classification results timeline ===
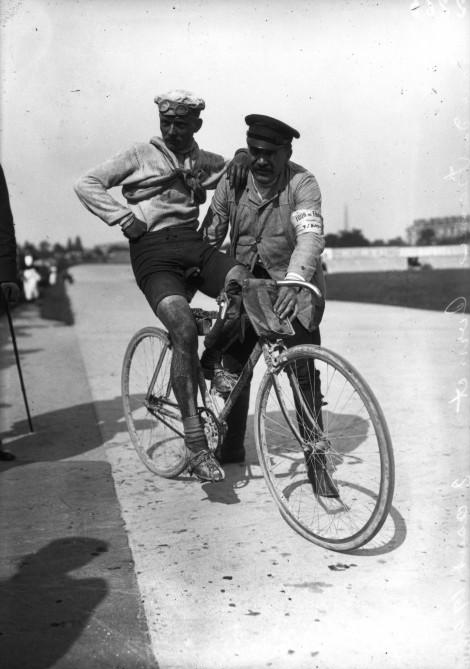
Henri Cornet after the finish of the 1908 Tour de France

Grand Tour	1904	1905	1906	1907	1908	1909	1910	1911	1912
Giro d'Italia	N/A	N/A	N/A	N/A	N/A	DNE	DNE	DNE	DNE
Tour de France	1	DNF-4	DNE	DNF-5	8	DNF-3	16	12	28
Vuelta a España	N/A	N/A	N/A	N/A	N/A	N/A	N/A	N/A	N/A

Legend
1	Winner
2–3	Top three-finish
4–10	Top ten-finish
11–	Other finish
DNE	Did not enter
DNF-x	Did not finish (retired on stage x)
DNS-x	Did not start (not started on stage x)
HD-x	Finished outside time limit (occurred on stage x)
DSQ	Disqualified
N/A	Race/classification not held
NR	Not ranked in this classification
