= César Garin =

Italian-French cyclist

César Garin (16 December 1879, Arviers – 27 March 1951) was an Italian-born French professional bicycle racer.

Garin competed as a professional cyclist from 1899 to 1906, and lived in Paris until his death at the age of 71.

His best results were: Roubaix – Bray-Dunes 1899 3rd; Paris-Roubaix 1904 2nd; Tour de France, 1904 2nd on Stage 5 to Nantes.

His older brothers Maurice and Ambroise were also professional bicycle racers.
