= Lucien Pothier =

French cyclist

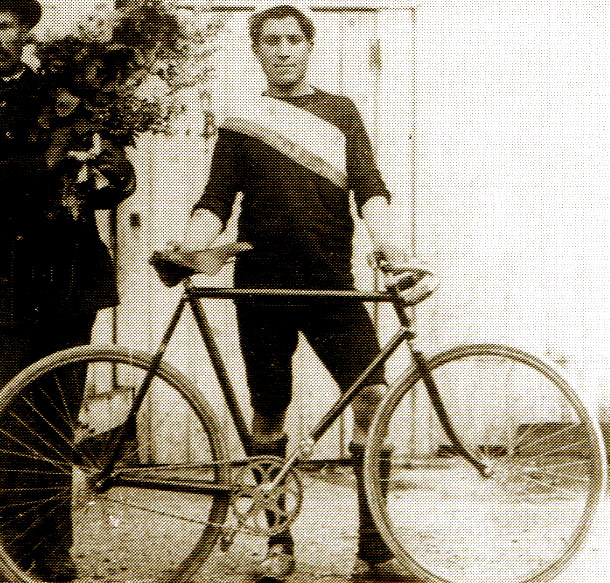

Personal information
- Full name: Lucien Pothier
- Born: 15 January 1883 Cuy, France
- Died: 29 April 1957 (aged 74) Troyes, France

Cycling career
- Sport: Cycling
- Discipline: Road
- Role: Rider

Professional teams
- 1903-1904: La Française
- 1905-1906: Peugeot
- 1907: Labor
- 1909-1911: Le Globe

Major wins
- 2nd place 1903 Tour de France

Lucien Pothier (15 January 1883 – 29 April 1957) was a successful early twentieth century French racing cyclist who participated in the 1903 Tour de France and finished second.

He also rode in the 1904 Tour de France, again finishing second to Maurice Garin. The 1904 Tour was riddled with scandal. The first four winners were among the many riders disqualified. Garin was banned by the French cycling union for two years. Pothier at first received a lifetime ban, but in 1907 he was able to start again in the Tour de France.

== Palmarès ==
1903
Tour de France:

2nd place overall classification

1904

3rd place Paris–Roubaix
