= List of cyclists in the 1903 Tour de France =

Cyclist of Tour de France in 1903

In the 1903 Tour de France, in contrast to modern stage races, a cyclist who gave up during a stage was allowed to start again the next stage, although he would no longer be in contention for the general classification. Thus Hippolyte Aucouturier, who gave up during the first stage, was able to return, and won the second and third stages. Charles Laeser, winner of the fourth stage, had not completed the third stage.

60 cyclists, all professionals or semi-professionals, started the race, of whom 49 were French, 4 Belgian, 4 Swiss, 2 German, and one Italian; 21 of them were sponsored by bicycle manufacturers, while 39 entered without commercial support. 24 other cyclists took advantage of the opportunity to enter specific stages: one rode in both the second and fourth stages, and additionally three cyclists took part in the second stage, one in the third stage, fifteen in the fourth stage only, and a further four only competed in the fifth stage.

== By starting number ==
Legend
| No. | Starting number worn by the rider during the Tour |
| Pos. | Position in the general classification |
| Time | Deficit to the winner of the general classification |
| DNF | Denotes a rider who did not finish |
| AB | Denotes a rider who abandoned |
Age correct as of 19 July 1903, the date on which the Tour ended

| No. | Name | Nationality | Age | Pos. | Time | Ref |
|---|---|---|---|---|---|---|
| 1 | Maurice Garin | France | 32 | 1 | 94h 33' 14" | |
| 2 | Gustave Pasquier | France | 25 | 8 | + 10h 24' 04" | |
| 3 | Lucien Barroy | France | | DNF (AB-3) | — | |
| 5 | Alexandre Foureaux | France | | 16 | + 31h 50' 52" | |
| 6 | Henri Gauban | France | | DNF (AB-2) | — | |
| 7 | Louis Barbrel | France | | DNF (AB-1) | — | |
| 8 | Hippolyte Aucouturier | France | 26 | DNF (AB-1) | — | |
| 9 | Marcel Kerff | Belgium | 37 | 6 | + 5h 52' 24" | |
| 10 | Léon Georget | France | 23 | DNF (AB-5) | — | |
| 11 | Eugène Brange | France | | DNF (AB-5) | — | |
| 12 | Jean Fischer | France | 36 | 5 | + 4h 58' 44" | |
| 14 | Isidore Le Chartier | France | | 14 | + 24h 05' 13" | |
| 15 | Benjamin Mounier | France | | DNF (AB-1) | — | |
| 17 | Emile Pagie | France | | DNF (AB-2) | — | |
| 21 | Jean Dargassies | France | 31 | 11 | + 13h 49' 40" | |
| 22 | Emile Moulin | France | | 18 | + 49h 43' 15" | |
| 24 | Jules Sales | Belgium | 28 | DNF (AB-1) | — | |
| 26 | Édouard Wattelier | France | 26 | DNF (AB-1) | — | |
| 27 | Claude Chapperon | France | | DNF (AB-1) | — | |
| 28 | Julien Lootens | Belgium | 26 | 7 | + 8h 31' 08" | |
| 29 | René Salais | France | | 17 | + 32h 34' 43" | |
| 31 | Léon Habets | France | | DNF (AB-3) | — | |
| 32 | Victor Dupre | France | | DNF (AB-1) | — | |
| 33 | Rodolfo Muller | Italy | 26 | 4 | + 4h 39' 30" | |
| 36 | Jean Bedene | France | | DNF (AB-1) | — | |
| 37 | Lucien Pothier | France | 20 | 2 | + 2h 59' 31" | |
| 38 | Armand Périn | France | | DNF (AB-1) | — | |
| 39 | Fernand Augereau | France | 20 | 3 | + 4h 29' 34" | |
| 40 | Eugène Geay | France | | DNF (AB-1) | — | |
| 41 | Ernest Pivin | France | | DNF (AB-5) | — | |
| 42 | Paul Mercier | Switzerland | | DNF (AB-1) | — | |
| 43 | Pierre Desvages | France | 36 | 20 | + 62h 53' 54" | |
| 44 | Léon Pernette | France | | DNF (AB-3) | — | |
| 45 | François Beaugendre | France | 22 | 9 | + 10h 52' 14" | |
| 46 | Anton Jaeck | Switzerland | | DNF (AB-3) | — | |
| 47 | François Poussel | France | | DNF (AB-1) | — | |
| 48 | Josef Fischer | Germany | 38 | 15 | + 25h 14' 26" | |
| 49 | Ludwig Barthelmann | Germany | | DNF (AB-2) | — | |
| 50 | Julien Girbe | France | | 13 | + 23h 16' 32" | |
| 51 | Charles Laeser | Switzerland | 23 | DNF (AB-3) | — | |
| 53 | Georges Borot | France | | 19 | + 51h 37' 38" | |
| 54 | Léon Durandeau | France | | DNF (AB-1) | — | |
| 55 | Léon Riche | France | | DNF (AB-1) | — | |
| 56 | A. Lassartigue | France | | DNF (AB-1) | — | |
| 57 | L. Fougere | France | | DNF (AB-1) | — | |
| 58 | Emile Torisani | France | | DNF (AB-1) | — | |
| 59 | Henri Charrier | France | | DNF (AB-1) | — | |
| 62 | Ferdinand Payan | France | 33 | 12 | + 19h 09' 02" | |
| 63 | Paul Trippier | France | | DNF (AB-1) | — | |
| 64 | Henri Ellinamour | France | | DNF (AB-3) | — | |
| 65 | Jean-Baptiste Zimmermann | France | | DNF (AB-1) | — | |
| 66 | Marcel Lequatre | Switzerland | | DNF (AB-3) | — | |
| 67 | Arsène Millocheau | France | 36 | 21 | + 64h 57' 08" | |
| 69 | François Monachon | France | | DNF (AB-3) | — | |
| 71 | Aloïs Catteau | Belgium | 25 | 10 | + 12h 44' 57" | |
| 73 | Victor Lefevre | France | | DNF (AB-1) | — | |
| 75 | Auguste Daumain | France | 25 | DNF (AB-1) | — | |
| 76 | Gustave Guillarme | France | | DNF (AB-2) | — | |
| 77 | Charles Quetier | France | | DNF (AB-1) | — | |
| 78 | Philippe De Balade | France | | DNF (AB-5) | — | |
| 100 | Elie Monge | France | | DNF | — | |
| 101 | Garrot | France | | DNF | — | |
| 102 | Cabanna | France | | DNF | — | |
| 103 | Paul Armbruster | France | | DNF | — | |
| 120 | Boisseau | France | | DNF | — | |
| 121 | Armante | France | | DNF | — | |
| 122 | Honoré Fossier | France | | DNF | — | |
| 124 | Louis Fabre | France | | DNF | — | |
| 125 | Camille Biere | France | | DNF | — | |
| 126 | Maurice Lartigue | France | 25 | DNF | — | |
| 127 | Jean-Baptiste Dortignacq | France | 19 | DNF | — | |
| 128 | David Dupont | France | | DNF | — | |
| 129 | Paul Aermbruster | France | | DNF | — | |
| 130 | André Desbordes | France | | DNF | — | |
| 131 | Edouard Chaudron | France | | DNF | — | |
| 132 | Georges Lorgeou | France | | DNF | — | |
| 133 | Goyon | France | | DNF | — | |
| 134 | Florane | France | | DNF | — | |
| 135 | Pujol | France | | DNF | — | |
| 140 | Ambroise Garin | Italy | | DNF | — | |
| 141 | René Magdelein | France | | DNF | — | |
| 142 | Daniel Roques | France | | DNF | — | |
| 144 | H. Lesur | France | | DNF | — | |

== By nationality ==
The number of stage wins and winners in the table below is incomplete.

| Country | No. of riders | Finishers | Stage wins |
|---|---|---|---|
| France | 49 | 16 (65.3%) | 2 (Hippolyte Aucouturier x2 |
| Belgium | 4 | 3 (75.0%%) | 0 |
| Switzerland | 4 | 0 (0.0%) | 1 (Charles Laeser) |
| Germany | 2 | 1 (50.0%) | 0 |
| Italy | 2 | 1 (50.0%) | 0 |
| TOTAL | 144 | 21 (14.6%%) | 3 |
