= 1903 Tour de France, Stage 4 to Stage 6 =

Cycling race stages

Route of the 1903 Tour de France

The 1903 Tour de France was the 1st edition of Tour de France, one of cycling's Grand Tours. The Tour began in Paris on 1 July and Stage 4 occurred on 12 July with a flat stage from Toulouse. The race finished at the Parc des Princes in Paris on 18 July.

== Stage 4 ==
12 July 1903 — Toulouse to Bordeaux, 268 km (166.5 mi)

Stage 4 result

Rank	Rider	Time
1	Charles Laeser (SUI)	8h 46' 00"
2	Julien Lootens (BEL)	+ 4' 03"
3	Rodolfo Muller (ITA)	s.t.
4	Léon Georget (FRA)	s.t.
5	Maurice Garin (FRA)	s.t.
6	Jean Fischer (FRA)	s.t.
7	Lucien Pothier (FRA)	s.t.
8	Eugène Brange (FRA)	+ 7' 41"
9	Aloïs Catteau (BEL)	s.t.
10	Jean Dargassies (FRA)	+ 26' 00"

General classification after stage 4

Rank	Rider	Time
1	Maurice Garin (FRA)	59h 50' 42"
2	Léon Georget (FRA)	+ 1h 58' 53"
3	Fernand Augereau (FRA)	+ 2h 58' 01"
4		
5		
6		
7		
8		
9		
10		

== Stage 5 ==
13 July 1903 — Bordeaux to Nantes, 425 km (264.1 mi)

Stage 5 result

Rank	Rider	Time
1	Maurice Garin (FRA)	16h 26' 31"
2	Georges Pasquier (BEL)	s.t.
3	Lucien Pothier (FRA)	s.t.
4	Fernand Augereau (FRA)	+ 10' 35"
5	Ambroise Garin (ITA)	+ 33' 34"
6	Rodolfo Muller (ITA)	+ 36' 33"
7	Jean Fischer (FRA)	+ 1h 04' 03"
8	Marcel Kerff (BEL)	s.t.
9	Jean Dargassies (FRA)	+ 1h 21' 09"
10	Ferdinand Payan (FRA)	+ 1h 33' 24"

General classification after stage 5

Rank	Rider	Time
1	Maurice Garin (FRA)	76h 07' 31"
2	Lucien Pothier (FRA)	+ 2h 58' 01"
3	Fernand Augereau (FRA)	+ 4h 29' 14"
4		
5		
6		
7		
8		
9		
10		

== Stage 6 ==
18 July 1903 — Nantes to Paris, 471 km (293 mi)

Stage 6 result

Rank	Rider	Time
1	Maurice Garin (FRA)	18h 09' 00"
2	Fernand Augereau (FRA)	+ 10"
3	Julien Lootens (BEL)	s.t.
4	Jean Fischer (FRA)	+ 1' 20"
5	Lucien Pothier (FRA)	+ 1' 30"
6	Rodolfo Muller (ITA)	+ 2' 00"
7	Alexandre Foureaux (FRA)	+ 2' 30"
8	Julien Girbe (FRA)	+ 2' 35"
9	François Beaugendre (FRA)	+ 21' 00"
10	Marcel Kerff (BEL)	+ 53' 00"

General classification after stage 6

Rank	Rider	Time
1	Maurice Garin (FRA)	94h 33' 14"
2	Lucien Pothier (FRA)	+ 2h 59' 21"
3	Fernand Augereau (FRA)	+ 4h 29' 24"
4	Rodolfo Muller (ITA)	+ 4h 39' 30"
5	Jean Fischer (FRA)	+ 5h 08' 44"
6	Marcel Kerff (BEL)	+ 7h 04' 24"
7	Julien Lootens (BEL)	+ 9h 33' 08"
8	Georges Pasquier (BEL)	+ 11h 26' 04"
9	François Beaugendre (FRA)	+ 11h 54' 14"
10	Aloïs Catteau (BEL)	+ 13h 46' 57"
