= 1903 Tour de France, Stage 1 to Stage 3 =

Cycling race stages

Route of the 1903 Tour de France

The 1903 Tour de France was the 1st edition of Tour de France, one of cycling's Grand Tours. The Tour began in Paris on 1 July and Stage 3 occurred on 8 July with a flat stage to Toulouse. The race finished at the Parc des Princes in Paris on 18 July.

== Stage 1 ==
1 July 1903 — Paris (Montgeron) to Lyon, 467 km (290.2 mi)

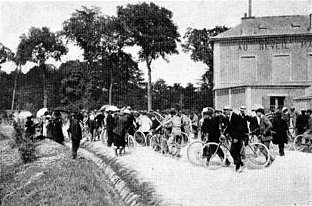
The departure from the Café au Réveil-Matin in Montgeron, 1903 Tour de France.

The inaugural stage of the Tour de France departed from the Cafe au Réveil-Matin, in the south-eastern Paris suburb of Montgeron, at 3:16 p.m. The route headed south through Fontainebleau, Corbeil, Melun, Montargis, Nevers, Moulins, Lapalisse and Roanne, before arriving in Lyon. The riders had raced through the evening and night, to arrive from about 9 a.m. on the following day.

Stage 1 result and general classification after stage 1

Rank	Rider	Time
1	Maurice Garin (FRA)	17h 45' 13"
2	Emile Pagie (FRA)	+ 55"
3	Léon Georget (FRA)	+ 34' 59"
4	Fernand Augereau (FRA)	+ 1h 02' 50"
5	Jean Fischer (FRA)	+ 1h 04' 55"
6	Marcel Kerff (BEL)	+ 1h 42' 55"
7	Aloïs Catteau (BEL)	+ 1h 48' 57"
8	Ernest Pivin (FRA)	+ 1h 49' 49"
9	Léon Habets (FRA)	+ 2h 08' 16"
10	François Beaugendre (FRA)	+ 2h 08' 27"

== Stage 2 ==
5 July 1903 — Lyon to Marseille, 374 km (232.4 mi)

Stage 2 result

Rank	Rider	Time
1	Hippolyte Aucouturier (FRA)	14h 28' 53"
2	Léon Georget (FRA)	s.t.
3	Eugène Brange (FRA)	+ 26' 06"
4	Maurice Garin (FRA)	+ 26' 07"
5	Rodolfo Muller (ITA)	s.t.
6	Lucien Pothier (FRA)	s.t.
7	Marcel Kerff (BEL)	+ 39' 37"
8	Fernand Augereau (FRA)	+ 57' 17"
9	Georges Pasquier (BEL)	+ 1h 32' 10"
10	François Beaugendre (FRA)	s.t.

General classification after stage 2

Rank	Rider	Time
1	Maurice Garin (FRA)	32h 40' 13"
2	Léon Georget (FRA)	+ 8' 52"
3	Fernand Augereau (FRA)	+ 1h 34' 00"
4		
5		
6		
7		
8		
9		
10		

== Stage 3 ==
8 July 1903 — Marseille to Toulouse, 423 km (263 mi)

Stage 3 result

Rank	Rider	Time
1	Hippolyte Aucouturier (FRA)	17h 55' 04"
2	Eugène Brange (FRA)	+ 32' 22"
3	Julien Lootens (BEL)	s.t.
4	Maurice Garin (FRA)	s.t.
5	Lucien Pothier (FRA)	s.t.
6	François Beaugendre (FRA)	+ 1h 00' 00"
7	Jean Fischer (FRA)	+ 1h 35' 18"
8	Rodolfo Muller (ITA)	+ 1h 35' 19"
9	Aloïs Catteau (BEL)	+ 1h 35' 20"
10	Marcel Kerff (BEL)	s.t.

General classification after stage 3

Rank	Rider	Time
1	Maurice Garin (FRA)	51h 07' 39"
2	Léon Georget (FRA)	+ 1h 58' 53"
3	Lucien Pothier (FRA)	+ 2h 58' 01"
4		
5		
6		
7		
8		
9		
10		
