= 1901 Paris–Roubaix =

Cycling race

Race details
- Dates: 7 April 1901
- Stages: 1
- Distance: 280 km (174.0 mi)
- Winning time: 10h 49' 36"

Results
	Winner	Lucien Lesna (FRA)
	Second	Ambroise Garin (ITA)
	Third	Lucien Itsweire (FRA)

The 1901 Paris–Roubaix was the sixth edition of the Paris–Roubaix, a classic one-day cycle race in France. The single day event was held on 7 April 1901 and stretched 280 km (174 mi) from Paris to its end in a velodrome in Roubaix. The winner was Lucien Lesna from France.

== Results ==
Final results (1–10)
Rank	Cyclist	Time
1	Lucien Lesna (FRA)	10h 49' 36″
2	Ambroise Garin (ITA)	+26' 00″
3	Lucien Itsweire (FRA)	+40' 03″
4	Alphonse Seys (BEL)	+59' 42″
5	Louis Schuller (FRA)	+1h 09' 51″
6	Alexandre Foureaux (FRA)	+1h 13' 12″
7	Jean Fischer (FRA)	+1h 18' 03″
8	Édouard Wattelier (FRA)	+1h 19' 36″
9	Pierre Chevalier (FRA)	+1h 26' 00″
10	Gustave Pasquier (FRA)	+1h 41' 13″
