= 1902 Paris–Roubaix =

Cycling race

Race details
- Dates: 30 March 1902
- Stages: 1
- Distance: 268 km (166.5 mi)
- Winning time: 10h 52' 07"

Results
	Winner	Lucien Lesna (FRA)
	Second	Édouard Wattelier (FRA)
	Third	Ambroise Garin (ITA)

The 1902 Paris–Roubaix was the seventh edition of the Paris–Roubaix, a classic one-day cycle race in France. The single day event was held on 30 March 1902 and stretched 268 km (167 mi) from Paris to its end in a velodrome in Roubaix. The winner was Lucien Lesna from France.

== Results ==
Final results (1–10)
Rank	Cyclist	Time
1	Lucien Lesna (FRA)	10h 52' 07″
2	Édouard Wattelier (FRA)	+08' 00″
3	Ambroise Garin (ITA)	+12' 00″
4	Claude Chapperon (FRA)	+20' 59″
5	Oscar Lepoutre (FRA)	+28' 21″
6	Jean Fischer (FRA)	+28' 57″
7	Philippe Leroux (FRA)	+33' 07″
8	Émile Pagie (FRA)	+38' 31″
9	Gustave Pasquier (FRA)	+47' 43″
10	B. Barbe (FRA)	+1h 04' 31″
