= 1899 Paris–Roubaix =

Cycling race

Race details
- Dates: 2 April 1899
- Stages: 1
- Distance: 268 km (167 mi)
- Winning time: 8h 22' 53"

Results
	Winner	Albert Champion (FRA)
	Second	Paul Bor (FRA)
	Third	Ambroise Garin (ITA)

The 1899 Paris–Roubaix was the fourth edition of the Paris–Roubaix, a classic one-day cycle race in France. The single day event was held on 2 April 1899 and stretched 268 km (167 mi) from Paris to its end in a velodrome in Roubaix. The winner was Albert Champion from France.

== Results ==
Final results (1–10)
Rank	Cyclist	Time
1	Albert Champion (FRA)	8h 22' 52″
2	Paul Bor (FRA)	+23' 21″
3	Ambroise Garin (ITA)	+23' 25″
4	Pierre Chevalier (FRA)	+54' 10″
5	Eugène Jay (FRA)	+1h 52' 08″
6	Marcel Kerff (BEL)	+1h 57' 38″
7	Lucien Itsweire (FRA)	+1h 58' 11″
8	Jules Dubois (FRA)	+2h 00' 54″
9	Lucien Delattre (FRA)	+2h 39' 08″
10	Jean Fischer (FRA)	+3h 20' 20″
