= Claude Chapperon =

French cyclist

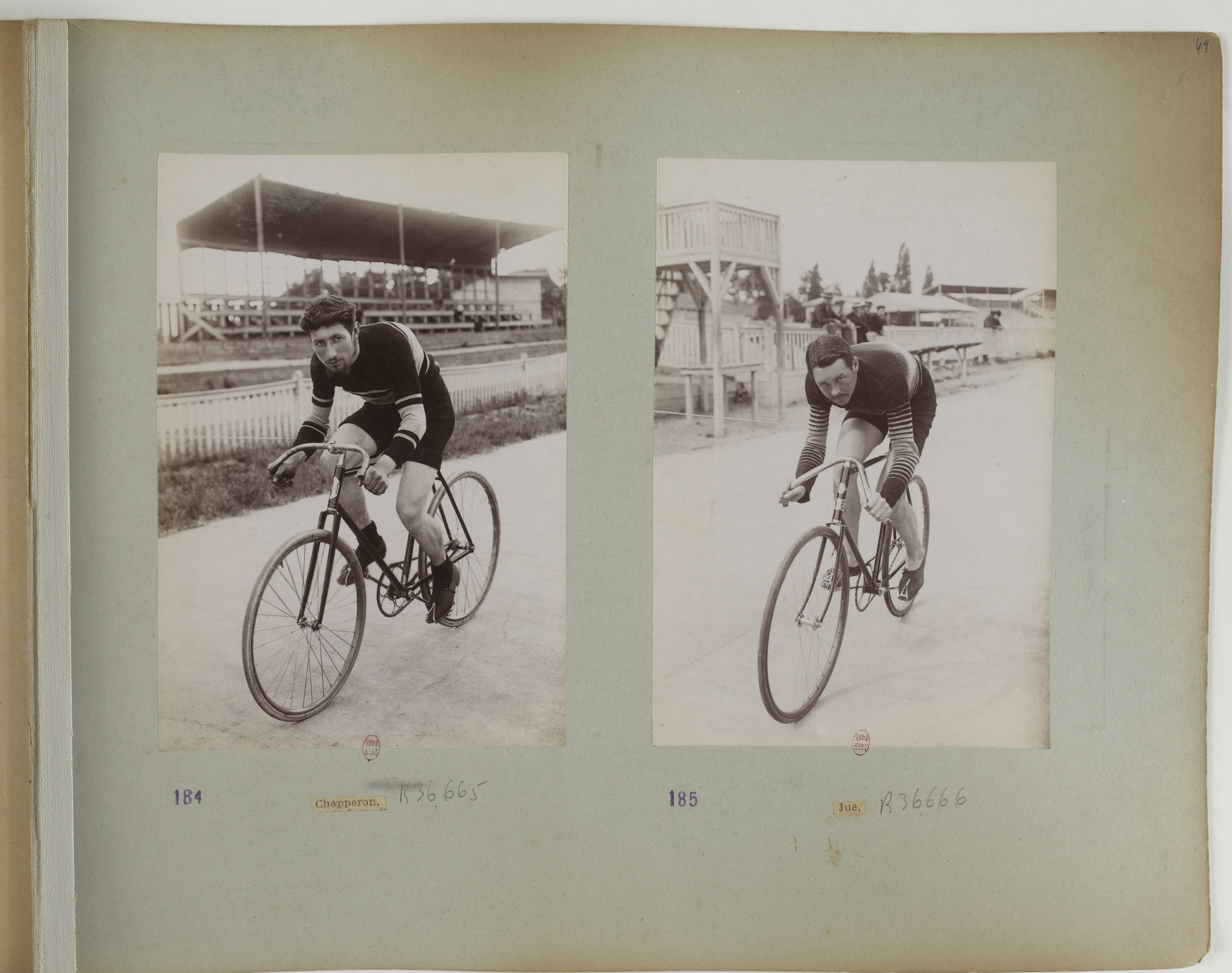
- Chapperon (left) in 1901

Personal information
- Born: November 13, 1877 Chambéry, France
- Died: November 5, 1944 (aged 66) Montrouge, France

Cycling career
- Sport: Cycling

Professional team
- Cyclistes Savoisiens

Claude Chapperon (13 November 1877 – 5 November 1944) was a French cyclist mainly active between 1897 and 1905. Chapperon was best known for his achievements in Paris–Roubaix in the early 20th century.

He won the Paris–Roubaix in 1901 for independent riders. During the 1903 Paris–Roubaix, before entering the velodrome where they had to ride three laps, he had an advantage together with Louis Trousselier of 50 metres. They changed bikes, on purpose or because they were involved in a crash, but he mistakenly took Trousselier’s bicycle and later had to change bikes again. Due to this setback he was taken over by Hippolyte Aucouturier and he finished second. He finished fourth at the 1902 Paris–Roubaix and sixth at the 1905 Paris–Roubaix.

He was one of the cyclist who started the inaugural 1903 Tour de France, but had to abandon the first stage.

== Major results ==
- 1897
  - 3rd Paris–Château-Thierry
- 1898
  - 1st: Paris–Vernon
  - 1st: Paris–Le Havre
  - 1st: Paris–Auxerre
  - 1st: Paris–Beauvais
  - 2nd Paris–Compiègne
  - 2nd Paris–Péronne
- 1899
  - 1st: La Garenne–Mantes
  - 3rd Paris–Rouen
  - 3rd Seine Championship
- 1900
  - 1st: Chanteloup Hill Climb
  - 1st: Paris–Neauphle
  - 1st: Paris-Dreux
  - 1st: Paris–Amiens
  - 1st: Orléans–Blois–Orléans
  - 1st: Paris–Dieppe
  - 2nd Seine Championship
  - 2nd Paris–Château-Thierry
  - 2nd Clichy–Conflans–Clichy
  - 3rd Coupe Galitzin
- 1901
  - 1st: Paris–Roubaix (Independents)
  - 1st: Paris–Creil–Paris
  - 1st: Paris–Amiens
  - 1st: Coupe Galitzin
  - 2nd: Paris–Châteaudun
- 1902
  - 4th Paris–Roubaix
- 1903
  - 2nd Paris–Roubaix
  - 2nd Guingamp–Lamballe–Guingamp
  - 2nd Louviers–Chartres–Louviers
  - 2nd Paris-Valenciennes
- 1905
  - 6th Paris–Roubaix
