= Desvages =

Desvages is a surname. Notable people with the surname include:

- André Desvages (1944–2018), French professional road bicycle racer
- Pierre Desvages (1867–1933), French cyclist
