= Le Mesnil-Villement =

- Commune
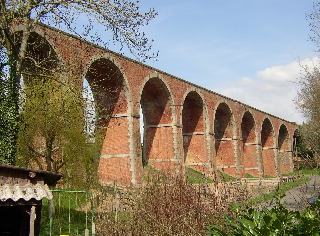
- La Foullerie Viaduct
- Location of Le Mesnil-Villement
- Location within France Location within Normandy
- Coordinates: 48°51′14″N 0°22′09″W
- Country: France
- Region: Normandy
- Department: Calvados
- Arrondissement: Caen
- Canton: Falaise
- Intercommunality: Pays de Falaise

Government
  - Mayor (2020–2026): André Lecoq
- Area^{1}: 3.55 km^{2} (1.37 sq mi)
- Elevation: 75 m (246 ft)
- Highest elevation: 187 m (614 ft)
- Lowest elevation: 48 m (157 ft)
- Population (2023): 282
  - Density: 79.4/km^{2} (206/sq mi)
- Time zone: UTC+01:00 (CET)
  - Summer (DST): UTC+02:00 (CEST)
- INSEE/Postal code: 14427 /14690
- ^{1} French Land Register data, which excludes lakes, ponds, glaciers > 1 km^{2} (0.386 sq mi or 247 acres) and river estuaries.

Le Mesnil-Villement (French pronunciation: [lə mɛnil vilmɑ̃]) is a commune in the Calvados department in the Normandy region in northwestern France.

== Geography ==
The commune is part of the area known as Suisse Normande.

The commune is made up of the following collection of villages and hamlets, La Landelle, Le Sainfoin, Le Pont des Vers, Le Haut des Vers, Le Val au Boëne and Le Mesnil-Villement.

The Commune with another 20 communes shares part of a 2,115 hectare, Natura 2000 conservation area, called the Vallée de l'Orne et ses affluents.

The commune has two rivers, the Orne and the Rouvre, plus two streams La Boullonniere & The Val Corbel.

== Population ==
Historical population
Year	Pop.	±% p.a.
1968	456	—
1975	416	−1.30%
1982	354	−2.28%
1990	302	−1.97%
1999	283	−0.72%
2007	293	+0.44%
2012	292	−0.07%
2017	299	+0.47%
2023	282	−0.97%
Source: INSEE

== Notable people ==
- Pierre Desvages - (1867 – 1933) a cyclist who raced in the first Tour de France was born here.

== See also ==
- Communes of the Calvados department
