= 1903 Paris–Roubaix =

Cycling race

Race details
- Dates: 11 April 1903
- Stages: 1
- Distance: 268 km (167 mi)
- Winning time: 9h 12' 30"

Results
| | Winner | Hippolyte Aucouturier (FRA) |
| | Second | Claude Chapperon (FRA) |
| | Third | Louis Trousselier (FRA) |

The 1903 Paris–Roubaix was the eighth edition of the Paris–Roubaix, a classic one-day cycle race in France. The single day event was held on 11 April 1903 and stretched 268 km (167 mi) from Paris to its end in a velodrome in Roubaix. The winner was Hippolyte Aucouturier from France.

== Results ==
Final results (1–10)
| Rank | Cyclist | Time |
|---|---|---|
| 1 | Hippolyte Aucouturier (FRA) | 9h 12' 30″ |
| 2 | Claude Chapperon (FRA) | +00' 02″ |
| 3 | Louis Trousselier (FRA) | +00' 39″ |
| 4 | Édouard Wattelier (FRA) | +01' 02″ |
| 5 | Georges Lorgeou (FRA) | +28' 30″ |
| 6 | Jean Fischer (FRA) | +39' 30″ |
| 7 | Gustave Pasquier (FRA) | +42' 30″ |
| 8 | Paul Trippier (FRA) | +47' 30″ |
| 9 | Léon Georget (FRA) | +55' 30″ |
| 10 | Oscar Lepoutre (BEL) | +1h 00' 30″ |
