= Lanterne rouge =

Last classified rider in the Tour de France

- Sport: Road bicycle racing
- Competition: Tour de France
- Awarded for: Last in classification
- English name: Red lantern
- Local name: Lanterne rouge (French)

History
- First award: 1903
- Editions: 113 (as of 2026)
- First winner: Arsène Millocheau (FRA)
- Most wins: Wim Vansevenant (BEL) (3 times)
- Most recent: Cees Bol (NED)

The lanterne rouge (French pronunciation: [lɑ̃tɛʁn ʁuʒ]) is the competitor in last place in the Tour de France. The phrase comes from the French for "Red Lantern" and refers to the red lantern hung on the rear vehicle of a passenger railway train or the brake van of a freight train, which signalmen would look for in order to make sure none of the couplings had become disconnected.

== Cultural uses ==
In the Tour de France the rider who finishes last, rather than dropping out along the way, is accorded the distinction of lanterne rouge. Because of the popularity it affords, riders may compete for the last position rather than settling for a place near the back. Often the rider who comes last is remembered while those a few places ahead are forgotten. The revenue the last rider will generate from later appearance fees can be greater than if he had finished second to last, although this was more true when riders still made much of their income from post-Tour criteriums.

In the 1979 Tour de France, Gerhard Schönbacher and Philippe Tesnière were on the last two spots in the general classification, less than one minute apart. Tesnière had already finished last in the 1978 Tour, so he was aware of the publicity associated with being the lanterne rouge. In the 21st stage, a time trial, Tesnière therefore rode slowly. The winner of the time trial, Bernard Hinault, took 1 hour, 8 minutes and 53 seconds to cover the 48.8 km, Schönbacher used 1 hour, 21 minutes and 52 seconds, while Tesniere rode it in 1 hour, 23 minutes and 32 seconds; both were slower than all other cyclists. Tesnière's time was more than 20% slower than Hinault's, which meant that he had missed the time cut, and was taken out of the race.

The Tour organisation did not like the attention that the lanterne rouge received, and for the 1980 Tour devised a rule to make it more difficult to finish last: between the 14th and the 20th stage, the rider last in the general classification was removed from the race. Still, Schönbacher managed to finish last in that race. Before the Tour, Schönbacher was promised by his sponsor that he would receive extra money if he finished in last place. After the last stage of the Tour, his team leader Patrick Lefevere told Schönbacher that he would not get the money, and after a heated discussion, Schönbacher was fired.

Red lantern holders are often great sprinters or great riders of shorter races who are not fit enough for such a long race as the Tour de France, or who try to finish the race despite injury, as in the case of Sam Bennett, who finished last after breaking a finger in the opening stage of the 2016 Tour, but eventually won the green jersey in 2020.

In 2018 Lawson Craddock became the first rider in the history of the Tour de France to have the distinction of lanterne rouge for all stages of the entire tour. He crashed in the 1st stage resulting in facial lacerations and a fractured scapula. Despite his left eye being smashed and the pain of fractured scapula, he continued to race and finished the stage which led to a picture of his bloodied and grimacing face going viral. Later that day he posted an announcement on social media that he was donating $100 for every stage he finished to the Greater Houston Cycling Association to help rebuild the Alkek Velodrome that had been damaged by Hurricane Harvey. A GoFundMe page was also setup for donations to go directly to the velodrome. Craddock continued to ride all the remaining stages which garnered much publicity for the fundraising efforts and eventually over US$250,000 being raised for the cause. In this case the lanterne rouge has been described as being worn as "a badge of courage" and winning it as "a triumph of sporting endeavour".

== Lanternes rouges of the Tour de France ==
- 1903 Arsène Millocheau (FRA)
- 1904 Antoine Deflotrière (FRA)
- 1905 Clovis Lacroix (FRA)
- 1906 Georges Bronchard (FRA)
- 1907 Albert Chartier (FRA)
- 1908 Henri Anthoine (FRA)
- 1909 Georges Devilly (FRA)
- 1910 Constant Collet (FRA)
- 1911 Lucien Roquebert (FRA)
- 1912 Maurice Lartigue (FRA)
- 1913 Henri Alavoine (FRA)
- 1914 Henri Leclerc (FRA)
- 1915–18: no tour due to World War I
- 1919 Jules Nempon (FRA)
- 1920 Charles Raboisson (FRA)
- 1921 Henri Catelan (FRA)
- 1922 Daniel Masson (FRA)
- 1923 Daniel Masson (FRA)
- 1924 Victor Lafosse (FRA)
- 1925 Fernand Besnier (FRA)
- 1926 André Drobecq (FRA)
- 1927 Jacques Pfister (FRA)
- 1928 Edouard Persin (FRA)
- 1929 André Léger (FRA)
- 1930 Marcel Ilpide (FRA)
- 1931 Richard Lamb (AUS)
- 1932 Rudolf Risch (GER)
- 1933 Ernest Neuhard (FRA)
- 1934 Antonio Folco (ITA)
- 1935 Willy Kutschbach (GER)
- 1936 Aldo Bertocco (FRA)
- 1937 Aloyse Klensch (LUX)
- 1938 Janus Hellemons (NED)
- 1939 Armand Le Moal (FRA)
- 1940–46: no tour due to World War II
- 1947 Pietro Tarchini (SUI)
- 1948 Vittorio Seghezzi (ITA)
- 1949 Guido De Santi (ITA)
- 1950 Fritz Zbinden (SUI)
- 1951 Abdel-Kader Zaaf (FRA)
- 1952 Henri Paret (FRA)
- 1953 Claude Rouer (FRA)
- 1954 Marcel Dierkens (LUX)
- 1955 Tony Hoar (GBR)
- 1956 Roger Chaussabel (FRA)
- 1957 Guy Million (FRA)
- 1958 Walter Favre (SUI)
- 1959 Louis Bisilliat (FRA)
- 1960 José Herrero Berrendero (ESP)
- 1961 André Geneste (FRA)
- 1962 Augusto Marcaletti (ITA)
- 1963 Willy Derboven (BEL)
- 1964 Anatole Novak (FRA)
- 1965 Joseph Groussard (FRA)
- 1966 Paolo Mannucci (ITA)
- 1967 Jean-Pierre Genet (FRA)
- 1968 John Clarey (GBR)
- 1969 André Wilhelm (FRA)
- 1970 Frits Hoogerheide (NED)
- 1971 Georges Chappe (FRA)
- 1972 Alain Bellouis (FRA)
- 1973 Jacques-André Hochart (FRA)
- 1974 Lorenzo Alaimo (ITA)
- 1975 Jacques Boulas (FRA)
- 1976 Aad van den Hoek (NED)
- 1977 Roger Loysch (BEL)
- 1978 Philippe Tesnière (FRA)
- 1979 Gerhard Schönbacher (AUT)
- 1980 Gerhard Schönbacher (AUT)
- 1981 Faustino Cueli (ESP)
- 1982 Werner Devos (BEL)
- 1983 Marcel Laurens (BEL)
- 1984 Gilbert Glaus (SUI)
- 1985 Manrico Ronchiato (ITA)
- 1986 Ennio Salvador (ITA)
- 1987 Mathieu Hermans (NED)
- 1988 Dirk Wayenberg (BEL)
- 1989 Mathieu Hermans (NED)
- 1990 Rodolfo Massi (ITA)
- 1991 Rob Harmeling (NED)
- 1992 Fernando Quevedo (ESP)
- 1993 Edwig Van Hooydonck (BEL)
- 1994 John Talen (NED)
- 1995 Bruno Cornillet (FRA)
- 1996 Jean-Luc Masdupuy (FRA)
- 1997 Philippe Gaumont (FRA)
- 1998 Damien Nazon (FRA)
- 1999 Jacky Durand (FRA)
- 2000 Olivier Perraudeau (FRA)
- 2001 Jimmy Casper (FRA)
- 2002 Igor Flores (ESP)
- 2003 Hans De Clercq (BEL)
- 2004 Jimmy Casper (FRA)
- 2005 Iker Flores (ESP)
- 2006 Wim Vansevenant (BEL)
- 2007 Wim Vansevenant (BEL)
- 2008 Wim Vansevenant (BEL)
- 2009 Yauheni Hutarovich (BLR)
- 2010 Adriano Malori (ITA)
- 2011 Fabio Sabatini (ITA)
- 2012 Jimmy Engoulvent (FRA)
- 2013 Svein Tuft (CAN)
- 2014 Ji Cheng (CHN)
- 2015 Sébastien Chavanel (FRA)
- 2016 Sam Bennett (IRE)
- 2017 Luke Rowe (GBR)
- 2018 Lawson Craddock (USA)
- 2019 Sebastian Langeveld (NED)
- 2020 Roger Kluge (GER)
- 2021 Tim Declercq (BEL)
- 2022 Caleb Ewan (AUS)
- 2023 Michael Mørkøv (DEN)
- 2024 Mark Cavendish (GBR)
- 2025 Simone Consonni (ITA)
- 2026 Cees Bol (NED)

=== Multiple lanternes rouges of the Tour de France ===
Wins	Name	Years
3	Wim Vansevenant (BEL)	2006, 2007, 2008
2	Daniel Masson (FRA)	1922, 1923
2	Gerhard Schönbacher (AUT)	1979, 1980
2	Mathieu Hermans (NED)	1987, 1989
2	Jimmy Casper (FRA)	2001, 2004

Spain's Igor Flores received the lanterne rouge in 2002, and his brother Iker Flores received it in 2005.

=== Lanternes rouges of the Tour de France by nationality ===
Wins	Country	First	Most Recent (if more than 1)
53	France	1903	2015
12	Italy	1934	2025
11	Belgium	1963	2021
9	Netherlands	1938	2026
5	Spain	1960	2005
4	Switzerland	1947	1984
4	United Kingdom	1955	2024
3	Germany	1932	2020
2	Luxembourg	1937	1954
2	Austria	1979	1980
2	Australia	1931	2022
1	Belarus	2009	
1	Canada	2013	
1	China	2014	
1	Denmark	2023	
1	Ireland	2016	
1	United States	2018	

The first 24 red lanterns went to France between 1903 and 1930, with the French total reaching 53 in 2015. The rest of the world received its first red lantern in 1931, and eventually equaled France's total of 53 in 2019, and overtook it with 54 in 2020.

== See also ==
- Maglia nera
- Wooden spoon
- Iditarod Trail Sled Dog Race - last-placed competitor is known as the red lantern
