= Gustave Pasquier =

French cyclist (1877–1965)

Personal information
- Nickname: Le roux (The king)
- Born: October 7, 1877; Saulces-Monclin, Ardennes, France
- Died: April 6, 1965; Rethel, France

Gustave Pasquier (7 October 1877 – 6 April 1965) was a French racing cyclist.

He participated in the inaugural 1903 Tour de France, where he finished 8th overall. He also competed at other main international cycling races. He finished 3rd at Marseille–Paris behind Lucien Lesna and Rodolfo Muller. He also finished third at 1903 Bordeaux–Paris. He was nicknamed Le roux (The king).

He is often confused in Tour de France literature with other cyclists named Pasquier, particularly Arthur Pasquier. In a 1961 interview with the newspaper L'Ardennais, cited in Libération, Gustave Pasquier reflected on his participation in the 1903 Tour de France.

== Career results ==
=== 1900 ===
- 9th: Bordeaux-Paris

=== 1901 ===
- 7th Bordeaux - Paris ('01)
- 10th Paris - Roubaix ('01)

=== 1902 ===
- 3rd: Marseille–Paris
- 9th: Paris-Roubaix

=== 1903 ===
- 3rd: Bordeaux–Paris
- 8th: General classification 1908 Tour de France

- 2nd: stage 2

- 7th: 1903 Paris–Roubaix
