= Armand Périn =

French cyclist (1882–1916)

Personal information
- Full name: Armand Louis Périn
- Born: 22 December 1882 Paris (17th), France
- Died: 25 October 1916 (aged 33) Douaumont, France
- Height: 1.56 m (5 ft 1 in)

Cycling career
- Sport: Cycling
- Discipline: Road
- Role: Rider

Professional teams
- 1902–1903: Individual
- 1908: Individual

Armand Louis Périn (22 December 1882 – 25 October 1916) was a French road racing cyclist who competed professionally as an individual rider between 1902 and 1908. He participated in among others two editions of the Tour de France including the inaugural 1903 Tour de France.

== Biography ==
Périn was born on 22 December 1882 in the 17th arrondissement of Paris, France.

Périn competed as an individual professional road cyclist during the 1902, 1903 and 1908 seasons. In 1902 he finished 28th in the Paris–Roubaix. He competed in the inaugural 1903 Tour de France. He returned to the race in the 1908 Tour de France for the Perin Cycles team but had to abandon during the fourth stage.

Following the outbreak of World War I, Périn served as a private (soldier second class) in the 8th March Regiment of Infantry of the French Army. He was killed in action in Douaumont (Handremont-Douaumont) on 25 October 1916 and was officially recognised as Mort pour la France. His death was legally confirmed by the Tribunal of Neuilly-sur-Seine on 22 August 1922 and entered into the civil registers of the 17th arrondissement of Paris on 29 September 1922.

During the first world war centennial, in the summer of 2014, Périn was remembered among other cyclists who died in World War I.

Périn received media attention in 2017 before his bicycle on which he rode the 1903 Tour de France was auctioned. It was bought by art dealer Patrick van der Vorst in the Belgian television series Stukken van mensen (translated: Pieces of people).
