= Paul Bor =

French cyclist (1877–1921)

- Bor in ~1899

Personal information
- Born: 16 April 1877 Paris, France
- Died: 27 March 1921 (aged 43) Paris, France

Cycling career
- Sport: Cycling
- Discipline: Road
- Role: Rider

Major wins
- Paris–Rouen (1896); World hour record (1899)
Medal record
Men's cycling
Representing France
Summer Olympics
Third place	1900 Paris	25km motor-paced (professionals)

Bor between 1898 and 1900

Paul Bor (16 April 1877 – 27 March 1921) was a French road racing cyclist who competed professionally from 1886 to 1900. During his career he won Paris–Rouen and was the world hour record holder.

== Biography ==
In 1896 Bor won Paris–Rouen. Three years later he was runnner-up in 1899 Paris–Roubaix. The same year, in September 1899, he broke the world hour record for cyclists riding behind pacers, covering 58.053 kilometres in one hour at the Parc des Princes velodrome.

In 1900, Bor took part in the professional cycling competitions held in connection with the Paris Olympic Games. He competed in the 50 kilometres, 100 kilometres, 100 miles, and 25 kilometres motor-paced events. He finished third in the 25 kilometres motor-paced race. Before July 2021 the IOC has never decided which events were "Olympic" and which were not. Nowadays, these events are not recognized by the International Olympic Committee as official Olympic medal competitions.

The same year Bor also competed in the 1900 Bordeaux–Paris. In 1905, Bor founded the Club sportif international (CSI).

Bor also played football for Racing Club de France.

Bor died at the age of 43 after a long illness at his home at 10 Rue de Richelieu in Paris. His funeral was held at the Church of Saint-Roch. A prize at the velodrome in Vincennes was named after him.

== Achievements ==
1896
1st Paris–Rouen

1899
World hour record behind pacers, 58.053 km
2nd Paris–Roubaix

1900
3rd - 1900 Summer Olympics (25 km professional race)
