= Albert Champion (cyclist) =

French cyclist

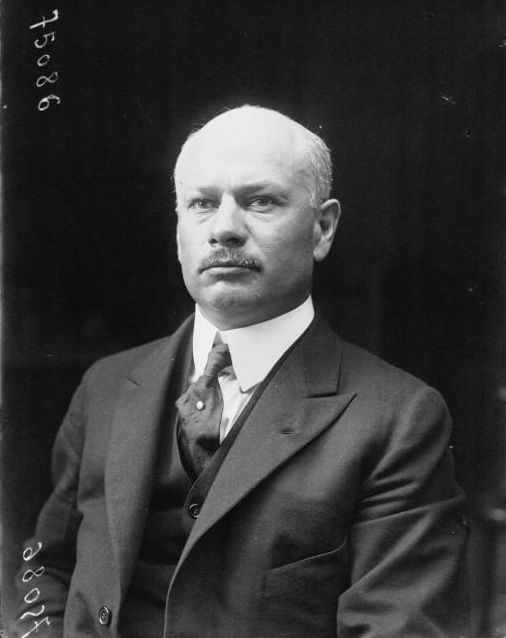
- Champion in 1919

Personal information
- Full name: Albert Champion
- Born: 5 April 1878 Paris, France
- Died: 26 October 1927 (aged 49) Paris, France

Cycling career
- Sport: Cycling
- Disciplines: Road, track
- Role: Rider

Major wins
- One-day races and Classics Paris–Roubaix (1899)

Albert Champion (5 April 1878 – 26 October 1927) was a French track bicycle racer and later an industrialist who won the 1899 Paris–Roubaix. In 1905 he incorporated the Albert Champion Company in Boston to make porcelain spark plugs with his name on them. Three years later founded the Champion Ignition Company in Flint, Michigan. In 1922 he changed the name to AC Spark Plug Company, after his initials, to settle out of court with his original partners in the Albert Champion Company. The company is now known as ACDelco and is owned by General Motors.

== Cycling ==
Champion was a racing cyclist at the end of the 19th century. His win in Paris–Roubaix came as a surprise because he had been known as a velodrome rider.

After Champion won Paris-Roubaix he received a contract from a bicycle manufacturer in Boston to race in America for the 1900 season. The offer coincided with Champion's receiving orders to report for compulsory conscription, which could have meant up to seven years in the army.

Champion raced behind motor-powered tandems during the 1900 season on outdoor board velodromes in cities from Boston to New York and down the east coast to Atlanta. He competed against riders such as Jimmy Michael and Bobby Walthour Sr. Three years later, he had won 100 races in America and imported a four-cylinder motorcycle from Paris. On 12 July 1903, Champion piloted his 350-pound French motorcycle around an outdoor board track in Cambridge Massachusetts, on what is now the MIT Campus. He drove a mile in 58.8 seconds, a world record on a motorcycle around an elliptical track.

He crashed driving a Packard Grey Wolf in a car race in October 1903 and snapped his femur in a compound fracture. He spent months in a New York hospital, finally leaving with one leg two inches shorter than the other. He hobbled out of the hospital on crutches and during his recovery made up his mind to enter the new auto industry. By June 1904, he returned to his native Paris to raise money and found a company in Boston importing French electrical parts. Coping with his shortened leg by using cranks of different lengths, he won the Grand Prix of Paris 50 km motorpace race on the Buffalo Velodrome and then the 100-kilometer motorpace championship on the Parc des Princes track by beating specialists such as defending national champion Henri Contenet and the "blond Adonis", Émile Bouhours. The race reopened the injury to his leg. He was taken to the Hôpital Boucicaut where he was operated on to remove several bone chips.

== Paris–Roubaix ==
The 1899 Paris–Roubaix was paced by automobiles and motor-tricycles. That was to attract velodrome riders, who were accustomed to motorpacing (see The Fast Times of Albert Champion). The race took place on a still day, 2 April, with 32 riders. They included the prominent road riders who had won earlier editions, Maurice Garin and Josef Fischer and track specialists such as Champion, Émile Bohours and Paul Bor. What the track riders had gained through experience in paced riding, they lost in inexperience of the cobbles and other bad road surfaces that constituted Paris–Roubaix.

Champion, still age 20 (he turned 21 on 5 April), was an outsider, but the others chased when he broke away alone soon after the start. Only Bouhours could come close to catching him, getting to within a minute at Amiens, at half distance. But Bouhours' hope of catching him ended when his pacer hit a spectator crossing the road. After Champion reached Arras, he was slowed to a walking pace riding the worst of the cobbles. Nye documents that Champion fell seven times but quickly got back up and remounted his bike. At the velodrome in Roubaix he still had 23 minutes on Bor and Ambroise Garin, brother of Maurice.

Champion finished in 8h 22m 53s, slow by comparison to Maurice Garin, who won the 1898 race in 10 minutes less despite bad weather.

== Motor products ==
Champion became interested in gas-combustion engines and car racing while he was in the USA. In the summer of 1904 he moved back to France and won the national 100-kilometer motor-pace race on the Parc des Princes outdoor cement track. He retired from cycling at the end of the summer. He remained in Paris to work in car factories, including one founded by his friend Edouard Nieuport, who manufactured Nieuport spark plugs and magnetos, credited with helping drivers win the biggest road races. Champion returned to America and incorporated the Albert Champion Company in June 1905 in Boston's South End, in the landmark Cyclorama Building, to import French electrical parts, including Nieuport components. Champion presided as president of the Albert Champion Company with partners Frank D. Stranahan as treasurer and younger brother Spencer Stranahan as clerk.

By 1907 The Albert Champion Company was manufacturing porcelain spark plugs with the name Champion stamped on the side, Robert Stranahan, the youngest of the Stranahan brothers, finished his classes at Harvard, ahead of his class of 1908, and went to work in the stockroom.

Late in the summer of 1908, Champion met William Durant at Durant's Boston Buick dealership. Durant, impressed with the spark plugs, persuaded Champion to move to Flint and supply his spark plugs to Flint. A week after Champion arrived in Flint—accompanied by his wife, youngest brother Prosper Champion, and a dozen French compatriots—Durant incorporated General Motors and quickly purchased Cadillac and Oldsmobile motor companies. Champion incorporated the Champion Ignition Company, in Lansing, Michigan in October 1908. His first office was on the top floor of Buick factory 1.

Champion's earlier partners, the Stranahan brothers, moved to Toledo, Ohio, and in 1910 incorporated the Champion Spark Plug Company in Wilmington, Delaware, as Nye documents. The Stranahans sued Albert Champion and his Champion Ignition Company over his name and the suit dragged on in federal district court. Champion finally settled out of court in 1922 and changed the name of his company to AC Spark Plug Company, after his initials, To this day, both names survive as ACDelco (GM products) and Champion spark plugs sold by Federal-Mogul.

== Personal life and death ==
Champion married his Paris childhood sweetheart in Cambridge, Massachusetts. They later divorced. In 1922 he married a younger woman from Kansas City.

Five years later, on 26 October 1927, Champion collapsed and died suddenly at age 49.

Champion is buried in Père Lachaise Cemetery in Paris alongside his mother.

In August 2015 a life-size bronze statue of Champion was erected in downtown Flint, part of the city's Back to the Bricks Automotive Pioneers Statute Project.

He was inducted into the Waltham (Massachusetts) Hall of Fame and the Automotive Hall of Fame in 1977.

== Palmarès ==
1899
1st, Paris–Roubaix
1904
1st, French National Stayers Championships
