= Pierre Chevalier (cyclist) =

French cyclist (1894-1946)

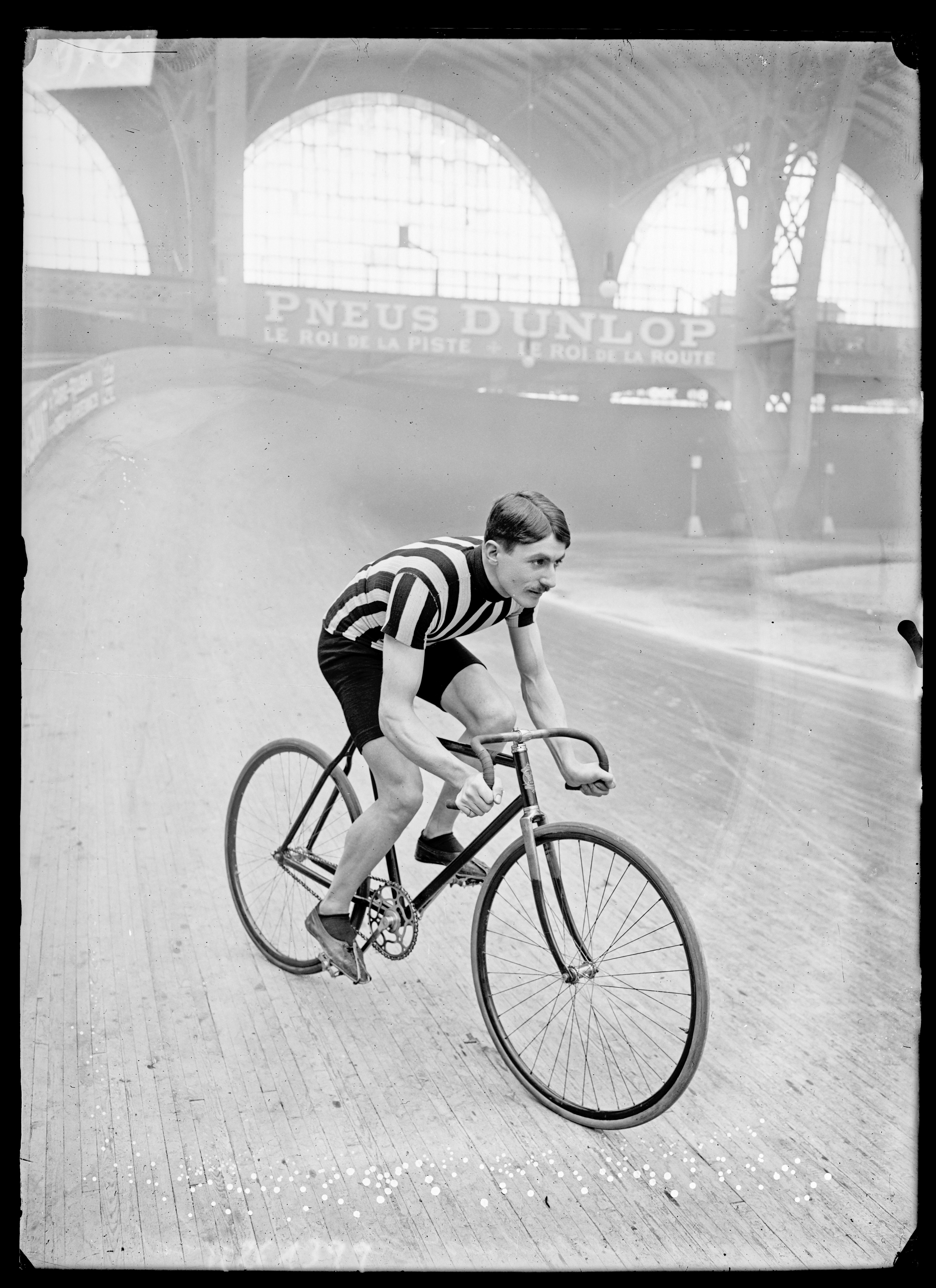
- Chevalier in 1905

Personal information
- Full name: Pierre Chevalier
- Born: 15 January 1894 Besson, Allier, France
- Died: 15 August 1946 (aged 52) Yzeure, France
- Height: 170 cm (5 ft 7 in)

Cycling career
- Sport: Cycling
- Disciplines: Road; Track
- Role: Rider
Medal record
Men's cycling
Representing France
Summer Olympics
Winner	1900 Paris	3000m
Winner	1900 Paris	National team sprint

Pierre Chevalier (15 January 1894 — 15 August 1946) was a French track cyclist and road racing cyclist active in the late 19th and early 20th centuries.

== Career ==
Chevalier had multiple top-10 achievements in the main international cycling races. He finished fourth in 1899 Paris-Roubaix and two years later ninth in the 1901 Paris-Roubaix. That year he also finished third in the 1901 Toulouse-Luchon-Toulouse and eighth in Paris-Brest-Paris.

In the United States he competed in six-day events between 1899 and 1902. During the 1900 Summer Olympics in Paris Chevalier was the winner of the 3000m with handicap style event for professional cyclists and also of the professional national team sprint event. However he is not officially recognized by the IOC as an Olympic champion as only amateurs were eligible on that era for an official Olympic title.

Pierre Chevalier was involved in one of the major scandals of the 1904 Tour de France. During the first stage from Montgeron to Lyon, he took advantage of the darkness and got into a car to cover part of the distance, ultimately finishing third. This was considered a form of cheating, and he admitted to the offense when it was revealed. As a result, he was disqualified from the race, though he was not the only one among the 88 participants to resort to such tactics. Chevalier's disqualification was part of a broader issue with many other competitors facing similar charges, leading to long-term suspensions and a reevaluation of how the Tour was organized. The race was ultimately seen as a chaotic and corrupt event and Chevalier's involvement in the scandal marked a dark chapter in the early history of the Tour de France.

== Palmarès ==
- 1899
  - 4th: Paris-Roubaix
- 1900
  - 1st: 3000 meters with handicap (professionals) at the 1900 Summer Olympics
  - 1st: National team sprint (professionals) at the 1900 Summer Olympics (with Rollin)
- 1901
  - 3rd: Toulouse-Luchon-Toulouse
  - 8th: Paris-Brest-Paris
  - 9th: Paris-Roubaix
