= Charles Kerff =

Belgian cyclist

Personal information
- Born: 4 December 1874 Sint-Pieters-Voeren, Belgium
- Died: 18 May 1902 (aged 27) Aix-en-Provence, France

Cycling career
- Sport: Cycling
- Disciplines: Road; Track
- Role: Rider

Charles Kerff (4 December 1874 – 18 May 1902) was the 1901 Belgian national track cycling champion in derny or pacemaker racing. A professional from 1896 until his death in 1902, Kerff also competed in 24 hours endurance cycling competitions.

== Personal life ==
There were ten boys in the Kerff family. Two of Charles' brothers, Marcel and Leopold, also became professional cyclists. When growing up, the siblings would ride their bicycles to Paris to pick up meat from wholesalers for their father, who had a butcher shop in their home village in Flanders. The round-trip was a distance of six or seven hundred kilometers.

== Final race ==
On 18 May 1902, the initial Marseille-Paris race was being held in terrible conditions of pouring rain. Both Charles and his brother Marcel participated. During the first stage Charles had a terrible crash and was taken to a hospital but died shortly thereafter. The facts of Charles Kerff's death have never been proven but after the race there were rumours that he had been attacked and beaten by French cycling fans who thought he might win. The news of Charles' death was kept from Marcel until he finished the race, in fourth place.

== Achievements ==
1896
3rd in Cheratte - Valkenburg - Cheratte
7th in Paris - Mons

1901
1st in Belgian National Track Championship, derny
3rd in 24 hours of Verviers
3rd in 24 hours of Berlin
Participated in the New York Six-Day Race

== See also ==
- List of racing cyclists and pacemakers with a cycling-related death
