= Ambroise Garin =

Italian-French cyclist

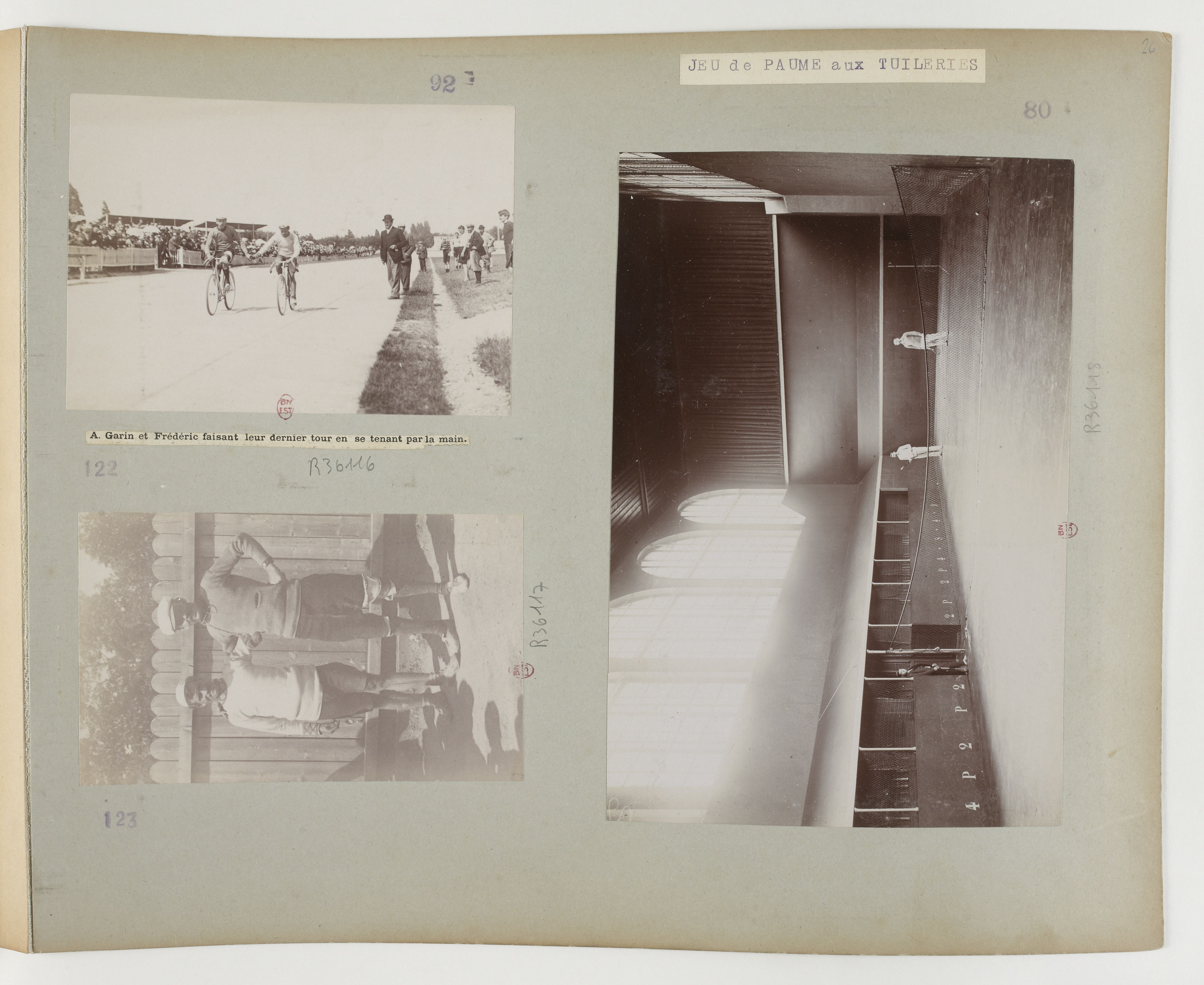
- Garin in 1900

Personal information
- Born: 10 May 1875 Arvier, Kingdom of Italy
- Died: 31 March 1969 (aged 93) Argenteuil, Val-d'Oise, France

Cycling career
- Sport: Cycling
- Current team: Retired
- Discipline: Road
- Role: Rider

Ambroise Garin (10 May 1875, Arviers – 31 March 1969) was an Italian-born French professional bicycle racer. His brothers Maurice and César were also professional bicycle racers.

Garin competed as a professional cyclist from 1899 to 1903. He had podium finished in the main cycling races of his era, including in the 1899, 1901 and 1902 Paris-Roubaix and in the 1900 and 1902 Bordeaux–Paris. He also competed in other main races, including the inaugural 1903 Tour de France. Garin also had his own bicycle brand.

He lived at Argenteuil, Val-d'Oise until his death at the age of 93.

== Achievements ==
1899
3rd Paris–Roubaix
3rd Bol d'Or
1900
2nd Toulouse–Luchon–Toulouse
3rd Bordeaux–Paris
3rd Bol d'Or
1901
2nd Paris–Roubaix
1902
3rd Paris–Roubaix
3rd Bordeaux–Paris
1903
9th Bol d'Or
5th Stage 5 1903 Tour de France
