= Émile Pagie =

Belgian-French cyclist

Personal information
- Full name: Émile Louis Pagie
- Born: January 8, 1883 Wervicq-Sud, France
- Died: August 1, 1937 (aged 54) Nogent-sur-Marne, France
- Height: 175 cm (5 ft 9 in)

Cycling career
- Sport: Cycling
- Discipline: Road
- Role: Rider

Professional teams
- 1899–1902: Individual
- 1903: Pagie Cycles
- 1903: La Française
- 1904: Individual

Émile Louis Pagie (8 January 1883 – 1 August 1937) was a French road cyclist of Belgian origin. He became a naturalized French citizen in 1915 after retiring from professional cycling. He was a main competitor in the inaugural 1903 Tour de France.

== Biography ==
Émile Louis Pagie was born on 8 January 1883 (though officially registered on the 9th) in Wervicq-Sud, a French town on the border with Belgium, to Belgian parents. He was the younger brother of cyclist Paul Pagie.

In 1903, he rode in the first-ever Tour de France. During the opening stage from Paris to Lyon, Pagie escaped alongside Maurice Garin and Léon Georget. Georget suffered a puncture before reaching Nevers, leaving Garin and Pagie alone at the front. The two pushed a hard pace and gradually increased their lead, passing through all checkpoints together, including the Col du Pin-Bouchain, before racing toward Lyon. Near the finish, Garin took advantage of a crash by Pagie just 200 metres (220 yd) from the line to win the stage in a time of 17h 45m 13s. Pagie finished less than a minute behind, while third-placed Georget arrived with a delay of nearly 35 minutes.

He also competed in other main cycling races and won Paris-Valenciennes in 1903 and had three times a top-10 finish at Paris–Roubaix.

On the morning of 1 August 1937 in Neuilly-sur-Marne, after breaking off a relationship with his partner Lucie Cloarec, a 41-year-old nurse at the Ville-Évrard asylum, Pagie shot her multiple times, seriously wounding her, before taking his own life with a shot to the heart.

== Major results ==
- 1899
  - Winner of Tourcoing–Armentières–Roubaix
  - Winner of Tourcoing–Quesnoy–Tourcoing
- 1900
  - 9th place, 1900 Paris–Roubaix
- 1902
  - 8th place, 1902 Paris–Roubaix
- 1903
  - Winner of Paris-Valenciennes
  - 1903 Tour de France
    - 2nd, stage 1
- 1904
  - 9th place, 1904 Paris–Roubaix

== See also ==
- List of cyclists in the 1903 Tour de France
