= Naintré =

- Commune
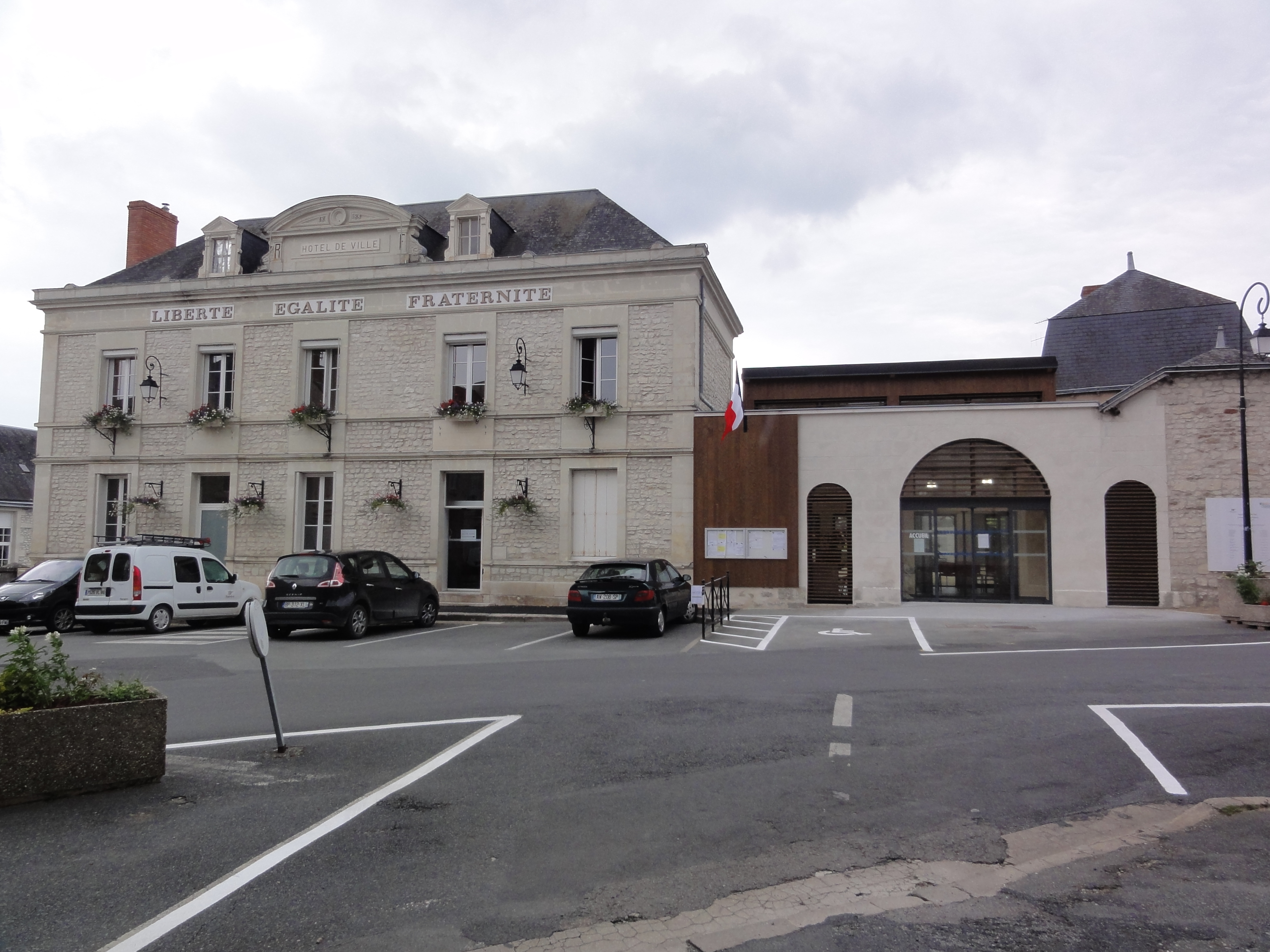
- The town hall in Naintré

- Coat of arms
- Location of Naintré
- Location within France Location within Nouvelle-Aquitaine
- Coordinates: 46°45′52″N 0°29′14″E
- Country: France
- Region: Nouvelle-Aquitaine
- Department: Vienne
- Arrondissement: Châtellerault
- Canton: Châtellerault-1
- Intercommunality: CA Grand Châtellerault

Government
  - Mayor (2020–2026): Christian Michaud
- Area^{1}: 24.86 km^{2} (9.60 sq mi)
- Elevation: 58 m (190 ft)
- Highest elevation: 131 m (430 ft)
- Lowest elevation: 49 m (161 ft)
- Population (2023): 5,964
  - Density: 239.9/km^{2} (621.3/sq mi)
- Time zone: UTC+01:00 (CET)
  - Summer (DST): UTC+02:00 (CEST)
- INSEE/Postal code: 86174 /86530
- ^{1} French Land Register data, which excludes lakes, ponds, glaciers > 1 km^{2} (0.386 sq mi or 247 acres) and river estuaries.

Naintré (French pronunciation: [nɛ̃tʁe]) is a commune in the Vienne department in the Nouvelle-Aquitaine region in western France.

== Demographics ==
Historical population
Year	Pop.	±% p.a.
1968	2,430	—
1975	3,460	+5.18%
1982	4,236	+2.93%
1990	4,718	+1.36%
1999	5,293	+1.29%
2007	5,775	+1.10%
2012	5,847	+0.25%
2017	5,911	+0.22%
2023	5,964	+0.15%
Source: INSEE

== See also ==
- Communes of the Vienne department
