= Arsène Millocheau =

French cyclist

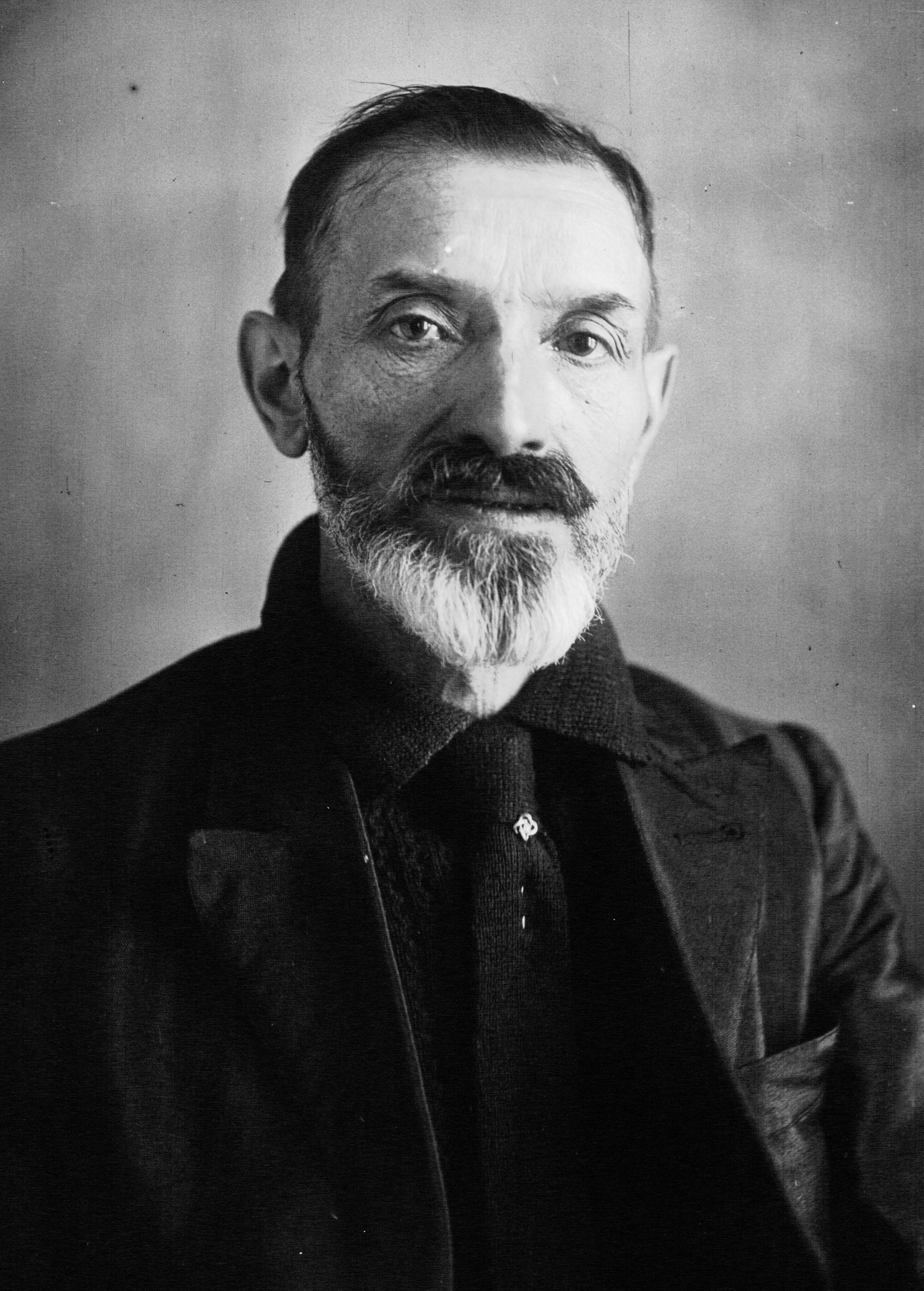
- Arsène Millocheau (1921)

Personal information
- Full name: Arsène Millocheau
- Born: 21 January 1867 Champseru, France
- Died: 4 May 1948 (aged 81) Paris, France

Cycling career
- Sport: Cycling
- Discipline: Road
- Role: Rider

Arsène Millocheau was a French cyclist of the early 1900s. He was born in Champseru in 1867.

He participated in the 1903 Tour de France, the first Tour, and came last, finishing behind the winner Maurice Garin by 64 hours, 57 minutes and 8 seconds, winning the Lanterne rouge (French: red lantern).

In 1921, 54 years old, Millocheau competed in the 1200 km Paris–Brest–Paris.

He died in Paris in 1948.
