= Charles Laeser =

Swiss cyclist

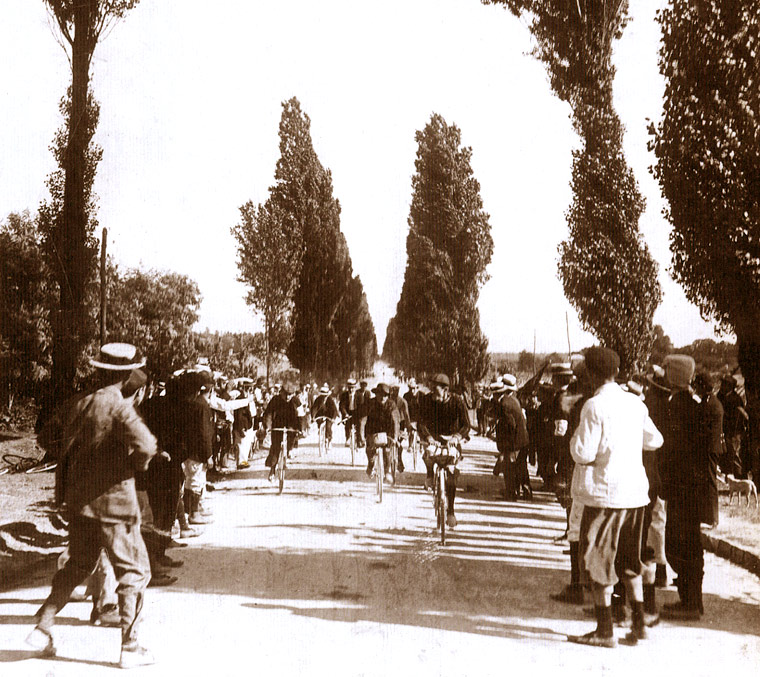
- Laesar winning the 4th stage of the 1903 Tour de France

Personal information
- Full name: Charles Laeser
- Born: 12 September 1879 Geneva, Switzerland
- Died: 28 July 1959 (aged 79) Geneva, Switzerland

Cycling career
- Sport: Cycling
- Discipline: Road
- Role: Rider

Major wins
- Stage four 1903 Tour de France

Charles Laeser (Geneva, 12 September 1879 — Geneva, 28 July 1959) was a Swiss professional road bicycle racer. Laeser entered 1903 Tour de France, the first edition of the race. He did not finish the third stage, but according to the rules then, he was still allowed to start the next stage. He started and even won the fourth stage, thus becoming the first foreign Tour de France stage winner. Laeser also entered the 1904 Tour de France, but did finish any stage.

== Major results ==
1903
1903 Tour de France:

Winner stage 4
