= Pierre Desvages =

French cyclist

Personal information
- Full name: Pierre Desvages
- Born: 16 April 1867 Le Mesnil-Villement, France
- Died: 16 January 1933 (aged 65) Limeil-Brévannes, France

Cycling career
- Sport: Cycling
- Discipline: Road
- Role: Rider

Professional team
- 1903-1910: -

Pierre Desvages (18 April 1867 – 16 January 1933) was a French cyclist of the early 1900s.

He participated in the 1903 Tour de France, the first Tour, and came 20th (second last), 62 hours, 53 minutes and 54 seconds behind the winner Maurice Garin. He is the only rider who started in the first eight Tours de France.

== Major competitions ==
- 1903 Tour de France – 20th place
- 1904 Tour de France – did not finish
- 1905 Tour de France – did not finish
- 1906 Tour de France – did not finish
- 1907 Tour de France – did not finish
- 1908 Tour de France – did not finish
- 1909 Tour de France – did not finish
- 1910 Tour de France – did not finish
