= Fernand Augereau =

French cyclist (1882–1958)

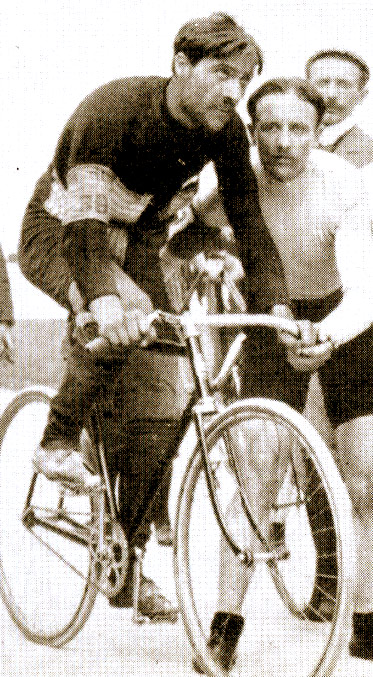

Personal information
- Full name: Fernand Augereau
- Born: 23 November 1882 Naintré, France
- Died: 26 July 1958 (aged 75) Combrée, France

Cycling career
- Sport: Cycling
- Discipline: Road
- Role: Rider

Professional team
- 1903: La Française

Major wins
- 1904 Bordeaux–Paris

Fernand Augereau (Naintré, 23 November 1882– Combrée, 26 July 1958) was a successful early twentieth century French road racing cyclist. Augereau, who was born in Naintré, participated in the 1903 Tour de France, where he finished third, and won Bordeaux–Paris in 1904. He was professional from 1902 to 1911.
