= Alexandre Foureaux =

French cyclist

Personal information
- Full name: Pierre Alexandre Foureaux
- Nickname: the flying carpenter
- Born: April 6, 1868 Champneuville, France
- Died: February 5, 1932 (aged 63) Verdun, France

Cycling career
- Sport: Cycling
- Discipline: Road
- Role: Rider

Professional team
- 1897–1904: Individual

Alexandre Foureaux (6 April 1868 – 5 February 1932) was a French road cyclist. He competed professionally in the late 19th century and early 20th century. He was one of the participants in the inaugural 1903 Tour de France.

== Biography ==
Originally from Lorraine, Foureaux began competing in cycling events in the late 1890s. In 1897, he finished second in Paris–Royan, behind Maurice Garin, and took seventh place in Bordeaux–Paris, one of the most prestigious races of the time. Three years later, he placed fifth in the endurance race Bol d'Or. In 1901, he won the 24 Hours of Verviers, and also achieved several top-ten finishes in major classics, including fifth in Bordeaux–Paris and sixth in Paris–Roubaix.

In 1903, he competed in the very first Tour de France. Supported by his wife, who traveled by train to meet him at the end of each stage, he earned the nickname "the flying carpenter". He finished 16th overall and placed seventh on the final stage.

== Major results ==
- 1896
  - 10th in Bordeaux–Paris
- 1897
  - 2nd in 24 Hours of Antwerp
  - 2nd in Paris–Royan
  - 7th in Bordeaux–Paris
- 1899
  - 2nd in 24 Hours of Verviers
- 1901
  - Winner of 24 Hours of Verviers
  - 5th in Bordeaux–Paris
  - 6th in Paris–Roubaix
- 1903
  - 16th General Classification 1903 Tour de France
