= Julien Lootens =

Belgian cyclist

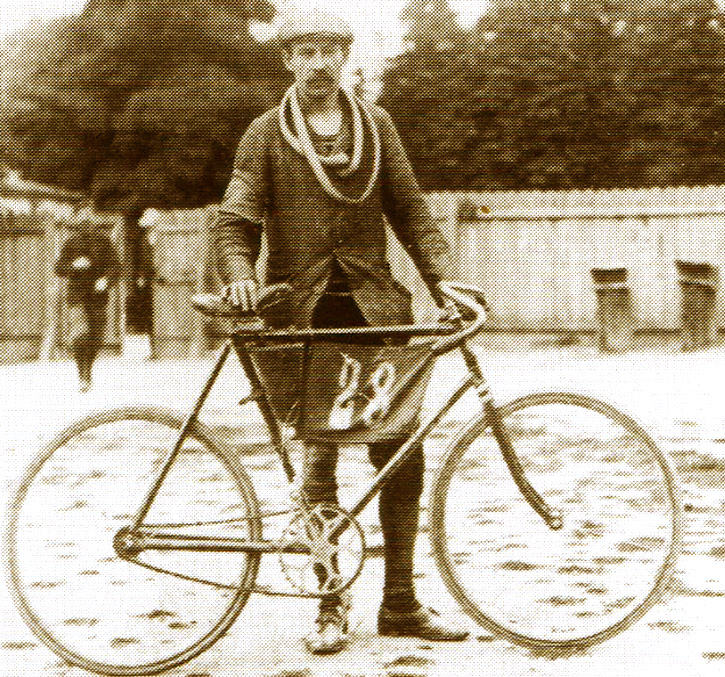
- Lootens in the 1903 Tour de France

Personal information
- Full name: Julien Lootens
- Nickname: Samson
- Born: 2 August 1876 Wevelgem, Belgium
- Died: 5 August 1942 (aged 66) Brussels, Belgium

Cycling career
- Sport: Cycling
- Discipline: Road
- Role: Rider

Professional teams
- 1903: Brennabor
- 1904–1905: JC Cycles
- 1906: Samson Cycles
- 1911: Alcyon - Dunlop
- 1913: La Française

Julien Lootens (2 August 1876 – 5 August 1942) was an early twentieth century Belgian cyclist who participated in the 1903 Tour de France and finished seventh. He was a professional cyclist between 1901 and 1921.

== Palmarès ==
1903
2nd Belgian National Road Race Championships
7th Tour de France

18th Stage 1, Tour de France, Lyon
15th Stage 2, Tour de France, Marseille
3rd Stage 3, Tour de France, Toulouse
2nd Stage 4, Tour de France, Bordeaux
12th Stage 5, Tour de France, Nantes
3rd Stage 6, Tour de France, Paris

1904
10th Paris - Roubaix

1905
20th Tour de France

1906
3rd Belgian National Track Championships, Sprint, Elite
