= Georges Pasquier =

French cyclist

Personal information
- Full name: Georges Pasquier
- Born: 11 March 1878

Cycling career
- Sport: Cycling
- Discipline: Road
- Role: Rider

Georges Pasquier (born 11 March 1878) was an early twentieth century French road racing cyclist who participated in the 1905 Tour de France but didn't finish it.
