= Lucien Lesna =

French cyclist

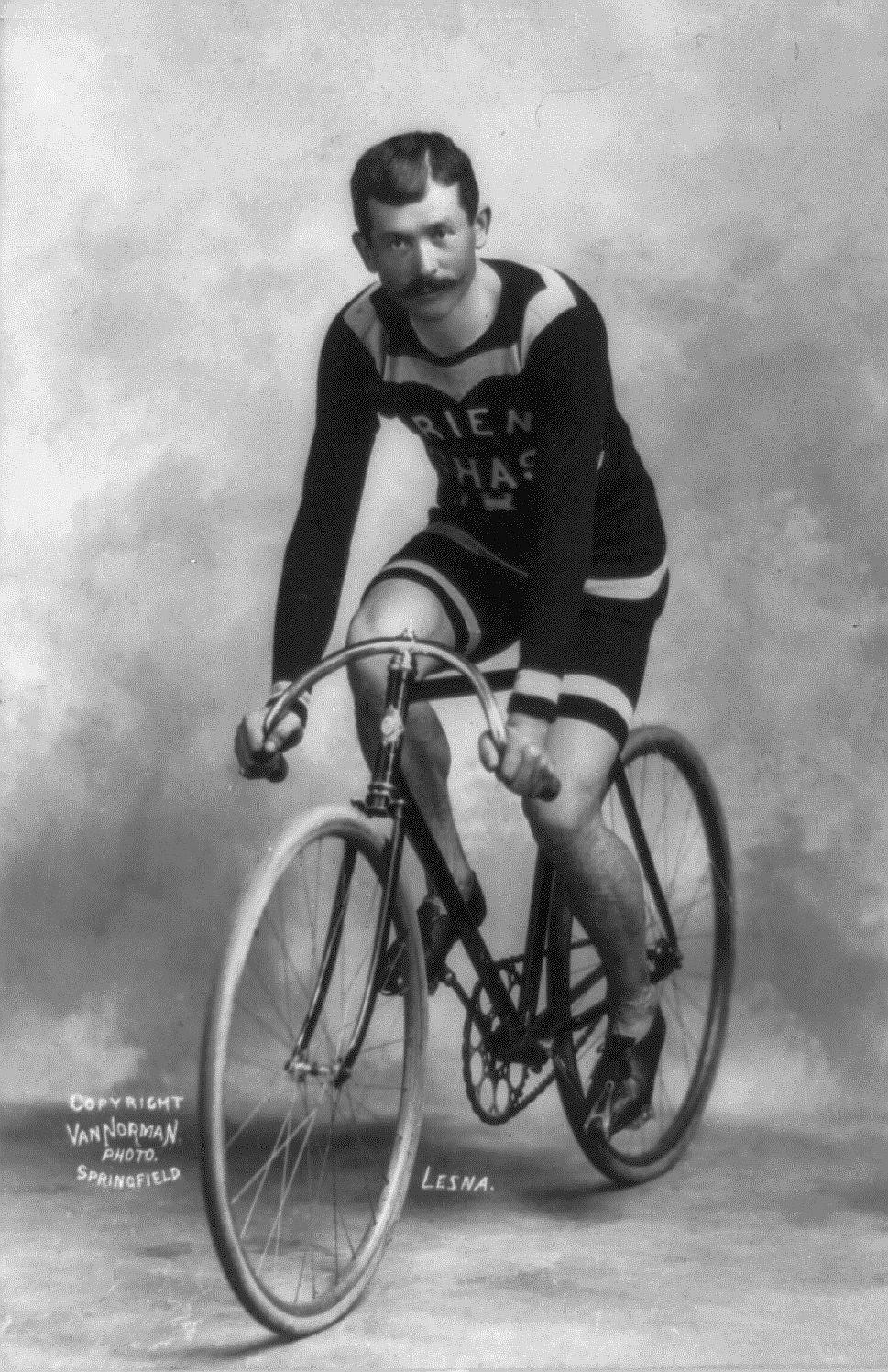
- Lesna c. 1898

Personal information
- Born: 10 November 1863 Le Locle, Switzerland
- Died: 11 July 1932 (aged 68) Évreux, France

Cycling career
- Sport: Cycling
- Role: Rider

Lucien Lesna (11 October 1863 – 11 July 1932) was a French racing cyclist. He won the 1901 and 1902 Paris–Roubaix races.
