= Eugène Brange =

French cyclist (1872–1931)

Personal information
- Born: 15 February 1872 Mâcon, France
- Died: 25 November 1931 (aged 59)
- Height: 1.69 m (5 ft 7 in)

Cycling career
- Sport: Cycling
- Discipline: Road
- Role: Rider

Eugène Brange (15 February 1872 – 25 November 1931) was a French road cyclist. He competed in the first editions of the Tour de France and recorded podium finishes on stages during the inaugural 1903 Tour de France.

== Biography ==
Brange was specialized in long-distance road races. Before the Tour de France was established, Brange finished seventh in the Marseille–Paris in 1902, a 938-kilometre (583 mi) race from Marseille to Paris that he completed in over 64 hours.

He started in the inaugural edition of the Tour de France, the 1903 Tour de France and rode as an individual. It consisted of six stages. The regulations prohibited pacing, soigneurs and outside mechanical assistance. The first stage covered 467 km and was completed by 37 of the 60 cyclists. Brange was the last cyclist to reach the finish. He completed the stage after more than 38 hours of riding, crossing the finish after two nights on the road.

The regulations at that time allowed cyclists who did not finish a stage to start the following day, but without any chance of competing for the overall classification. One of those who did not cross the finish line that day was Hippolyte Aucouturier, who suffered terrible stomach pains. Although Brange finished last and Aucouturier failed to finish the opening stage, both featured prominently in the following two stages. In the second stage Brange finished third behind Aucouturier, who won, and Léon Georget, who finished second. The third stage was from Marseille to Toulouse. At 423 kilometres (263 mi), it remains one of the five longest stages ever in Tour de France history. With almost 18.5 hours of cycling, Brange finished second behind Aucouturier. Brange also competed the next year in the 1904 Tour de France.
