= Rodolfo Muller =

Italian cyclist & journalist (1876–1947)

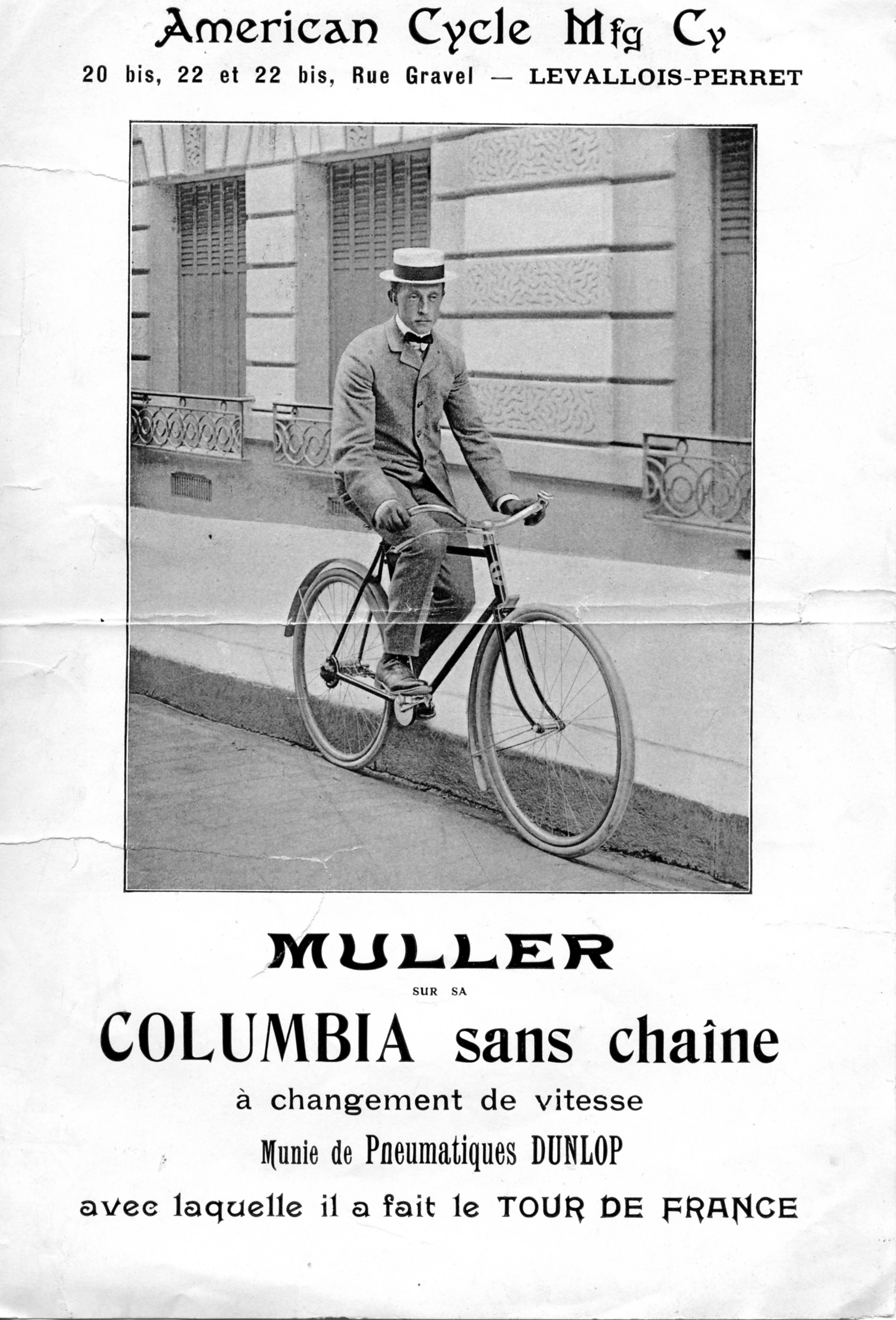

Personal information
- Born: 12 August 1876 Livorno, Italy
- Died: 11 September 1947 (aged 71) Paris, France

Cycling career
- Sport: Cycling
- Role: Rider

Professional teams
- 1898-1900: Individual
- 1901: Clément
- 1902: Individual
- 1903: La Française
- 1904: Individual

Rodolfo Muller (12 August 1876 – 11 September 1947) was an Italian racing cyclist and sports journalist. He finished sixth in the 1898 Paris–Roubaix, but his best season was 1902 with podium finishes in Bordeaux-Paris, Marseille-Paris and the Italian Corsa Nazionale. In that same year he also won the Concours de Tourisme du TCF, the first ever race to include the iconic Col du Tourmalet mountain pass.

== Major results ==
- 1897
  - 3rd Paris-Cabourg
- 1898
  - 6th Paris-Roubaix
- 1899
  - Record Paris-Torino on motorbike
- 1901
  - 6th Paris-Brest-Paris
- 1902
  - 1st Le Concours de Tourisme du TCF (First race to include the Col du Tourmalet)
  - 2nd Marseille-Paris
  - 3rd Corsa Nazionale / La Seicento
  - 3rd Bordeaux-Paris
- 1903
  - 1st Tour de France
- 1904
  - 1st 1000 kilometers of the Vélodrome d'Hiver

== Trivia ==
Rodolfo Muller's sister Marie Emma Anna was married first to Welsh track cyclist Jimmy Michael, who died during an Atlantic crossing on his way to races in the United States. After his death she remarried to Swedish-American cyclist/pacer Gussie Lawson, who died in a racing accident in 1913.
