= Marcel Kerff =

Belgian cyclist

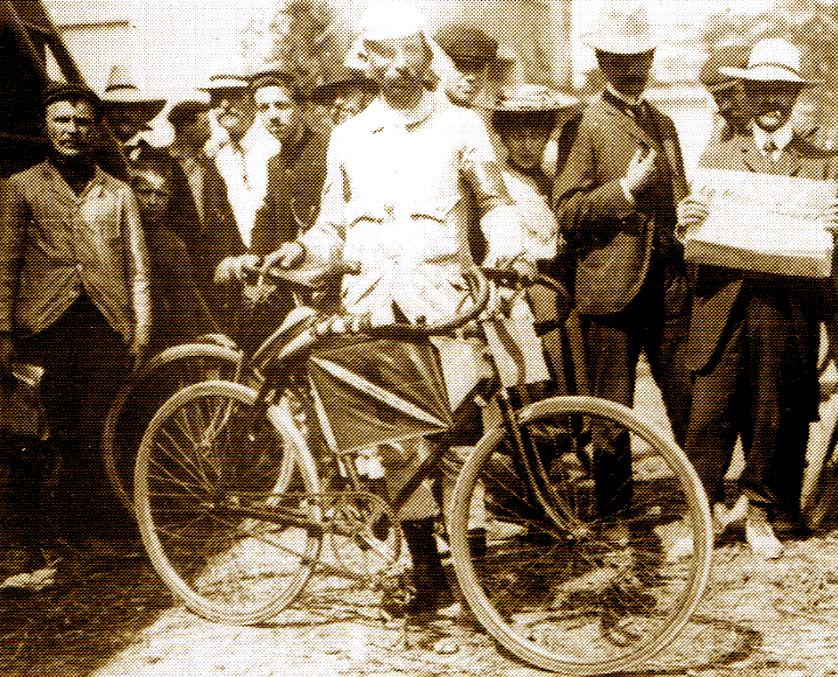

Personal information
- Full name: Marcel Kerff
- Born: 2 June 1866 Sint-Martens-Voeren, Belgium
- Died: 7 August 1914 (aged 48) Moelingen, Belgium

Cycling career
- Sport: Cycling
- Discipline: Road
- Role: Rider

Major wins
- 48 hours of Antwerp

Marcel Kerff (2 June 1866 – 7 August 1914) was a Belgian cyclist who participated in the 1903 Tour de France, where he finished sixth.

At the age of 48, after the German invasion of Belgium at the beginning of the First World War, Kerff was assumed to have been spying on German soldiers and was subsequently hanged.

A monument memorializing all Belgian cyclists that died during this war was erected later on in Moelingen near the place where he died.

His brothers Leopold Kerff and Charles Kerff were also professional cyclists.
