= 1903 Tour de France =

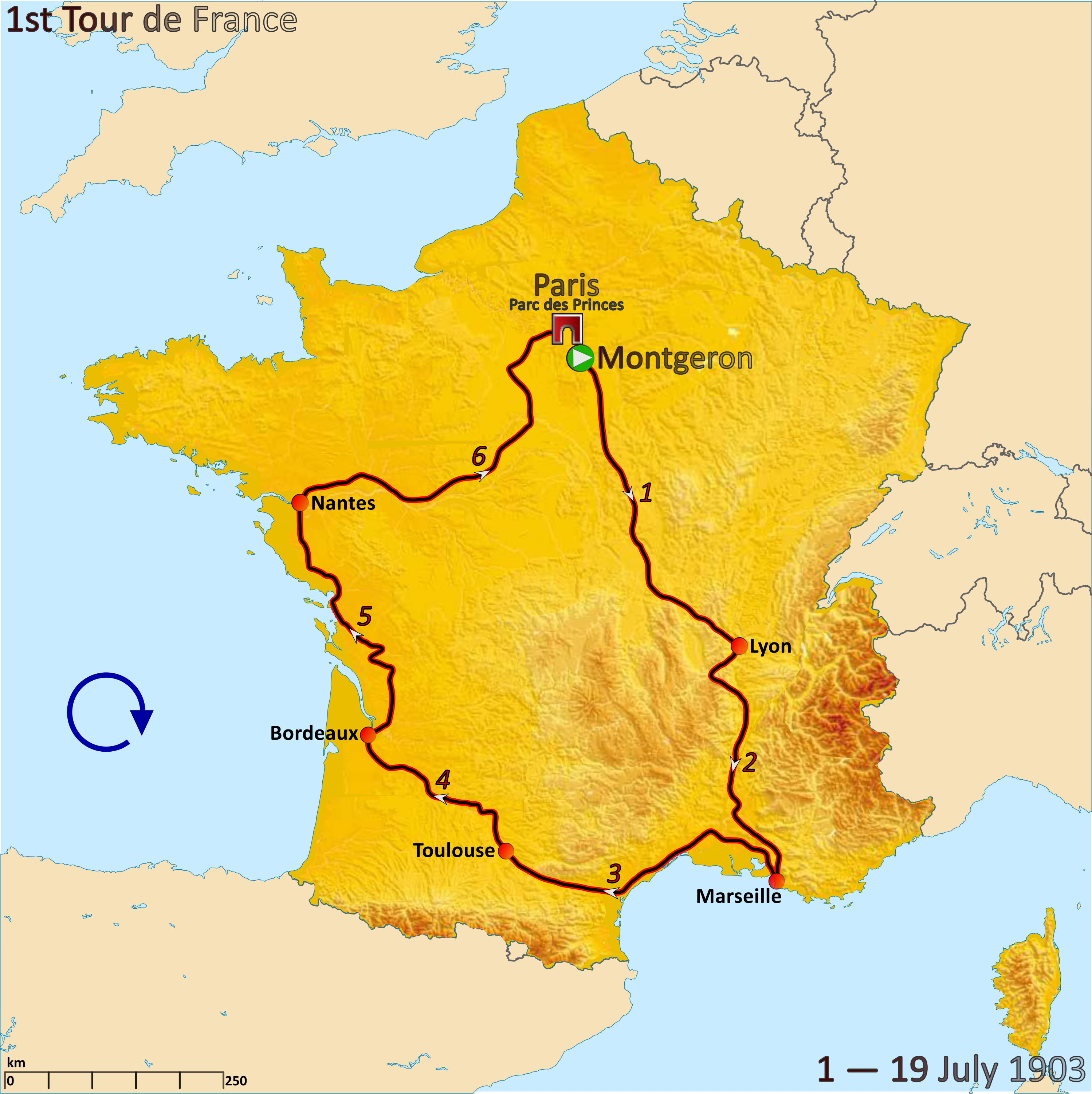
- Route of the 1903 Tour de France followed clockwise, starting in Montgeron and ending in Paris

Race details
- Dates: 1–19 July 1903
- Stages: 6
- Distance: 2,428 km (1,509 mi)
- Winning time: 94h 33' 14"

Results
	Winner	Maurice Garin (FRA)
	Second	Lucien Pothier (FRA)
	Third	Fernand Augereau (FRA)

The 1903 Tour de France was the first cycling race set up and sponsored by the newspaper L'Auto, ancestor of the current daily, L'Équipe. It ran from 1 to 19 July in six stages over 2,428 km (1,509 mi), and was won by Maurice Garin.

The race was invented to boost the circulation of L'Auto, after its circulation started to plummet from competition with the long-standing Le Vélo. Originally scheduled to start in June, the race was postponed one month, and the prize money was increased, after a disappointing level of applications from competitors. The 1903 Tour de France was the first stage road race, and compared to modern Grand Tours, it had relatively few stages, but each was much longer than those raced today. The cyclists did not have to compete in all six stages, although this was necessary to qualify for the general classification.

The pre-race favourite, Maurice Garin, won the first stage, and retained the lead throughout. He also won the last two stages, and had a margin of almost three hours over the next cyclist. The circulation of L'Auto increased more than sixfold during and after the race, so the race was considered successful enough to be rerun in 1904, by which time Le Vélo had been forced out of business.

== Origin ==
After the Dreyfus affair separated advertisers from the newspaper Le Vélo, a new newspaper L'Auto-Vélo was founded in 1900, with former cyclist Henri Desgrange as editor. After being forced to change the name of the newspaper to L'Auto in 1903, Desgrange needed something to keep the cycling fans; with circulation at 20,000, he could not afford to lose them.

When Desgrange and young employee Géo Lefèvre were returning from the Marseille–Paris cycling race, Lefèvre suggested holding a race around France, similar to the popular six-day races on the track. Desgrange proposed the idea to the financial controller Victor Goddet, who gave his approval, and on 19 January 1903, the Tour de France was announced in L'Auto.

It was to have been a five-week race, from 1 June to 5 July, with an entry fee of 20 francs. These conditions attracted very few cyclists: one week before the race was due to start, only 15 competitors had signed up. Desgrange then rescheduled the race from 1 to 19 July, reduced the entry fee to 10 francs and guaranteed at least five francs a day to the first 50 cyclists in the classification. After that, 79 cyclists signed up for the race, of whom 60 actually started the race.

== Rules and course ==
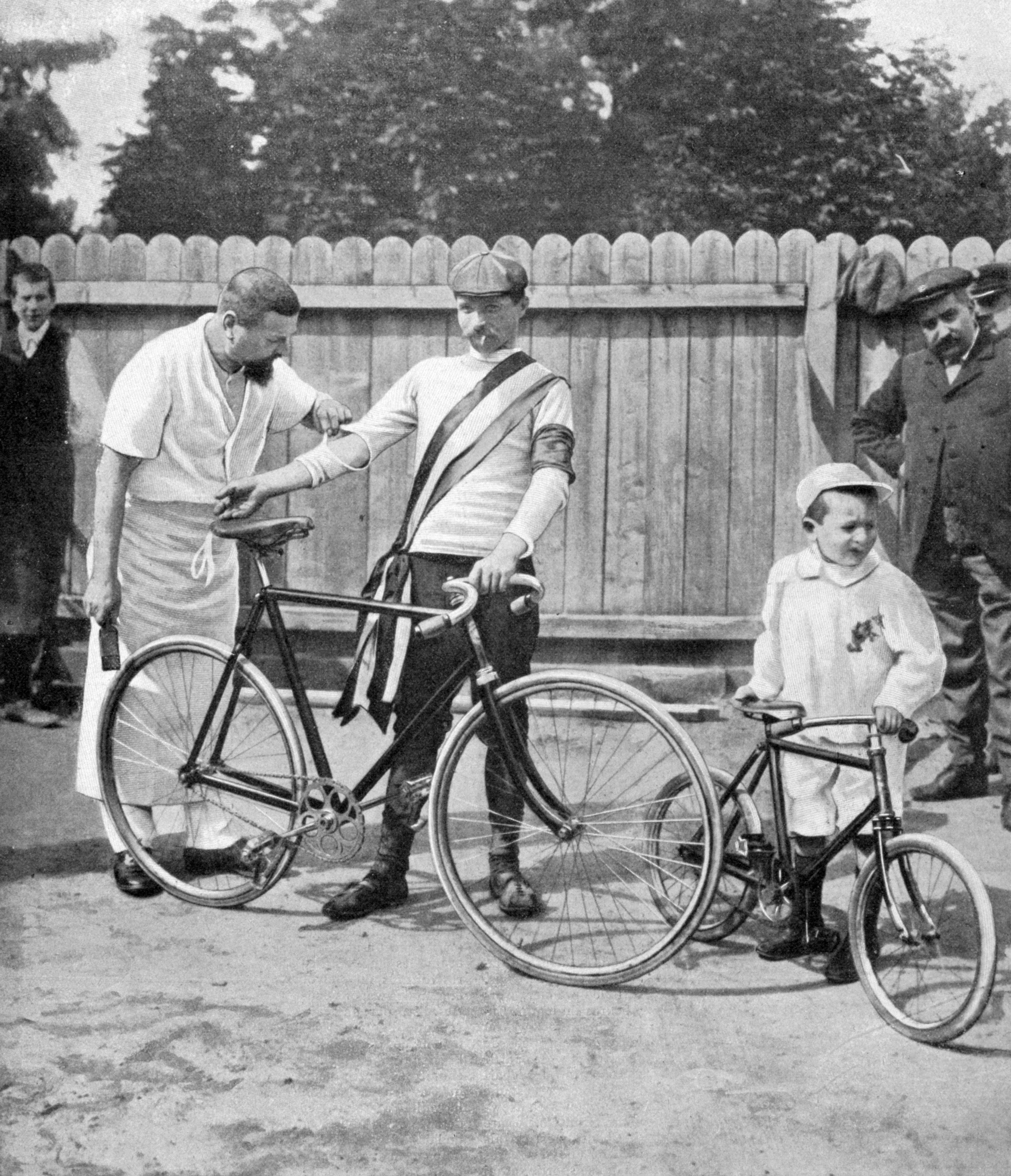
Maurice Garin, the winner of the 1903 Tour de France.

The 1903 Tour de France was run in six stages. Compared to modern stage races, the stages were extraordinarily long, with an average distance of over 400 km (250 mi), compared to the 171 km (106 mi) average stage length in the 2004 Tour de France; cyclists had one to three rest days between each stage, and the route was largely flat, with only one stage featuring a significant mountain. The cyclists were not grouped in teams but raced as individuals, and paid a fee of ten francs (about €135 at 2023 prices) to compete in the race for general classification, or five francs to enter a single stage. As the stages were so long, all but the first started before dawn: the last stage started at 21:00 the night before.

The first Tour de France crossed no mountain passes, but several lesser cols. The first was the col du Pin-Bouchain (759 m (2,490 ft)), on the opening stage from Paris to Lyon, on what is now the old road from Roanne to Lyon. The stage from Lyon to Marseille included the col de la République (1,161 m (3,809 ft)), also known as the col de Grand Bois, at the edge of St-Etienne.

In 1903, it was normal for a professional cyclist to hire pacers, who would lead them during the race. Desgrange forbade this: it was originally intended that in the final, longest, stage pacers would be allowed, but this was rescinded after the fifth stage.

To ensure that the cyclists rode the entire route, stewards were stationed at various points around the course. The yellow jersey for the leader in the general classification had not yet been introduced, but the leader was identified by a green armband.

The fastest eight cyclists on each stage received a prize between 50 francs and 1,500 francs, varying per stage. The fourteen best cyclists in the general classification received a prize from 3,000 francs for the winner to 25 francs for fourteenth place. The remaining seven cyclists to finish in the general classification each received 95 francs, 5 francs for each of the 19 days that the race took, provided that they had not won more than 200 francs in prize money and did not have an average speed below 20 km/h (12 mph) on any stage.

== Participants ==
In contrast to modern stage races, a cyclist who gave up during a stage was allowed to start again the next stage, although he would no longer be in contention for the general classification. Thus Hippolyte Aucouturier, who gave up during the first stage, was able to return, and won the second and third stages. Charles Laeser, winner of the fourth stage, had not completed the third stage.

Sixty cyclists, all professionals or semi-professionals, started the race, of whom 49 were French, 4 Belgian, 4 Swiss, 2 German, and one Italian; 21 of them were sponsored by bicycle manufacturers, while 39 entered without commercial support. 24 other cyclists took advantage of the opportunity to enter specific stages: one rode in both the second and fourth stages, and additionally three cyclists took part in the second stage, one in the third stage, fifteen in the fourth stage only, and a further four only competed in the fifth stage.

== Race overview ==
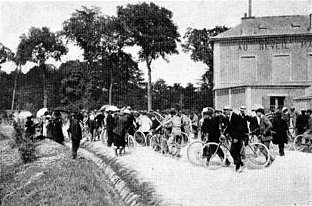
Café au Reveil Matin in Paris, 1903 Tour de France.

The pre-race favourites for the victory were Maurice Garin and Hippolyte Aucouturier. Garin dominated the race from the start by winning the first stage, a 471 km (293 mi) parcours from Paris to Lyon. The stage started at 15:16, and the cyclists initially rode with a speed of 35 km/h. The first cyclists abandoned after around 50 km (31 mi). At 23:00, Garin and Emile Pagie, leading the race, reached the control point in Nevers. Garin expected at that point that they would finish at 8:00 the next morning. During the night, Garin's main rival, Aucouturier, had stomach cramps, and was unable to finish the stage. Also during that first stage, the first breach of the rules occurred: Jean Fischer had used a car as pacer, which was illegal. Pagie fell down, but got up again; he and Garin kept leading the race during the night. Around 9:00 in the morning, both reached Lyon. Garin got away from Pagie, and finished one minute ahead.

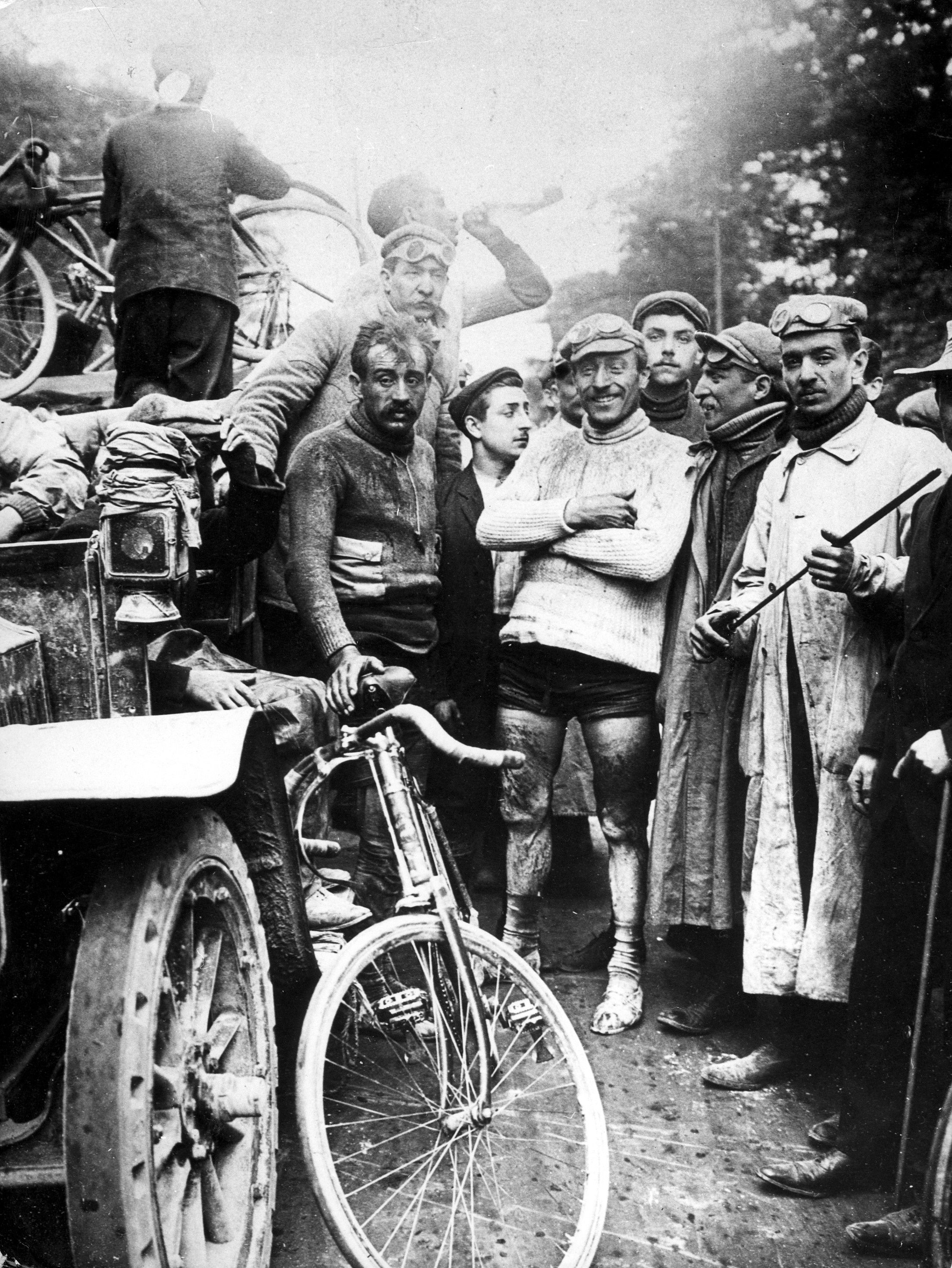
The finish of the first Tour.

Although Aucouturier had abandoned in the first stage, and so was not eligible for the general classification, he could still start the rest of the stages. In the second stage, Aucouturier was able to win the sprint. In the third stage, the cyclists who were competing for the general classification started one hour earlier than the other cyclists, including Aucouturier. At the end of that stage, a group of four cyclists had broken away, and Eugène Brange won the sprint. Aucouturier finished 27 minutes later, but this meant that he had run the course 33 minutes faster, so he was declared the winner of the stage. Garin retained the lead, helped by a crash of second-placed Pagie in the second stage, which eliminated him from the race. In the fourth stage, Aucouturier had a clear lead and seemed set to win a third successive stage, but was caught using the slipstream of a car, and was removed from the race. Swiss Charles Laeser (who had abandoned in the 3rd stage) took the victory, becoming the first non-French winner. As in the third stage, the cyclists departed in two groups, and Laeser was in the second group because he was no longer contending for the general classification. Laeser finished more than 50 minutes after a group of six cyclists, but he had travelled the distance 4 minutes faster than them, so he was declared the winner.

At that point, Garin was leading, with Émile Georget almost two hours behind. In the fifth stage, Georget had two flat tires, and fell asleep when he stopped at the side of the road to rest; he failed to finish. Thus Garin extended his lead by winning this stage, carrying nearly three hours' advantage into the final day's racing. Garin had requested other cyclists in the leading group to let him win the stage, but Fernand Augereau refused to do this. Garin then had Lucien Pothier throw down his bicycle in front of Augereau, who fell, and Garin then bent Augereau's rear wheel. Augereau quickly obtained a spare bike and continued to the finish, however Garin easily won the sprint. Augereau still received a prize of 100 francs from Velo-Sport Nantes for the fastest final kilometre of the stage in the Nantes velodrome.

The last stage was the longest, at 471 km (293 mi), and ran from Nantes to the small town of Ville-d'Avray, which lies between Versailles and Paris, instead of at the Parc des Princes velodrome. This was because of a bylaw forbidding road races to end on cycling tracks (a bylaw subsequently repealed in light of the race's success). Garin took his third stage win, and sealed overall victory by 2 hours 59 minutes 31 seconds: this remains the greatest margin of victory in the Tour de France. After arriving at Ville-d'Avray the riders were given a board marked with their finishing time and cycled on to Parc des Princes where they made several laps of honour. That day, 19 July, saw a large crowd at the velodrome to watch the riders and an earlier 100-km cycle race.

== Results ==
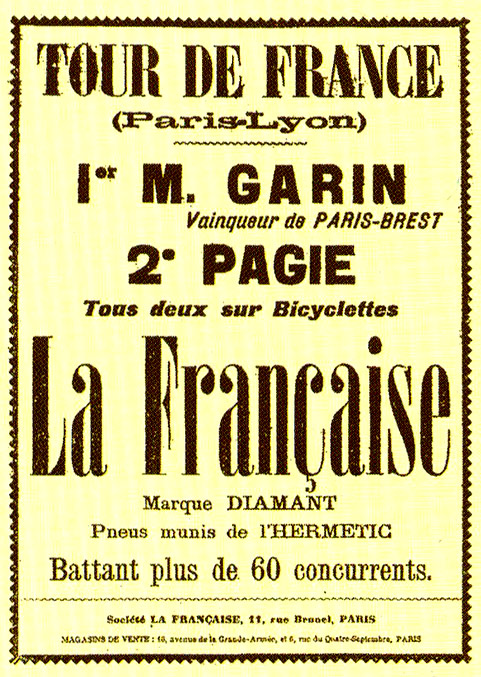
The publicity after the first stage showed that Maurice Garin rode a bicycle from La Française

=== Stage results ===
In 1903, there was no distinction in the rules between plain stages and mountain stages; the icons shown here indicate whether the stage included mountains.

Stage characteristics and winners
Stage	Date	Course	Distance	Type		Winner	Race leader
1	1 July	Paris to Lyon	467 km (290 mi)	Plain stage	Plain stage	Maurice Garin (FRA)	Maurice Garin (FRA)
2	5 July	Lyon to Marseille	374 km (232 mi)	Stage with mountain	Stage with mountain(s)	Hippolyte Aucouturier (FRA)	Maurice Garin (FRA)
3	8 July	Marseille to Toulouse	423 km (263 mi)	Plain stage	Plain stage	Hippolyte Aucouturier (FRA)	Maurice Garin (FRA)
4	12 July	Toulouse to Bordeaux	268 km (167 mi)	Plain stage	Plain stage	Charles Laeser (SUI)	Maurice Garin (FRA)
5	13 July	Bordeaux to Nantes	425 km (264 mi)	Plain stage	Plain stage	Maurice Garin (FRA)	Maurice Garin (FRA)
6	18 July	Nantes to Paris	471 km (293 mi)	Plain stage	Plain stage	Maurice Garin (FRA)	Maurice Garin (FRA)
	Total		2,428 km (1,509 mi)				

=== General classification ===
There were 21 cyclists who had completed all six stages. For these cyclists, the times taken for each stage were added up for the general classification. The cyclist with the least accumulated time was the winner. The cyclists officially were not grouped in teams; some cyclists had the same sponsor, even though they were not allowed to work together.

Final general classification (1–10)
Rank	Rider	Sponsor	Time
1	Maurice Garin (FRA)	La Française	94h 33' 14"
2	Lucien Pothier (FRA)	La Française	+ 2h 59' 21"
3	Fernand Augereau (FRA)	La Française	+ 4h 29' 24"
4	Rodolfo Muller (ITA)	La Française	+ 4h 39' 30"
5	Jean Fischer (FRA)	La Française	+ 4h 58' 44"
6	Marcel Kerff (BEL)	—	+ 5h 52' 24"
7	Julien Lootens (BEL)	Brennabor	+ 8h 31' 08"
8	Georges Pasquier (FRA)	La Française	+ 10h 24' 04"
9	François Beaugendre (FRA)	—	+ 10h 52' 14"
10	Aloïs Catteau (BEL)	La Française	+ 12h 44' 57"

Final general classification (11–21)
Rank	Rider	Sponsor	Time
11	Jean Dargassies (FRA)	Gladiator	+ 13h 49' 10"
12	Ferdinand Payan (FRA)	Champeyrache	+ 19h 09' 02"
13	Julien Girbe (FRA)	JC Cycles	+ 23h 16' 52"
14	Isidore Lechartier (FRA)	Gladiator	+ 24h 05' 13"
15	Josef Fischer (GER)	Diamant	+ 25h 14' 26"
16	Alexandre Foureaux (FRA)	—	+ 31h 50' 52"
17	René Salais (FRA)	—	+ 32h 34' 43"
18	Emile Moulin (FRA)	—	+ 49h 43' 14"
19	Georges Borot (FRA)	—	+ 51h 37' 38"
20	Pierre Desvages (FRA)	—	+ 62h 53' 54"
21	Arsène Millocheau (FRA)	—	+ 64h 57' 08"

== Aftermath ==
The circulation of L'Auto increased significantly due to this event; a special edition of 130,000 copies was made after the race was over, and normal circulation increased from 25,000 to 65,000. The big success made sure that the Tour de France was scheduled again for 1904. The cyclists had also become national heroes. Maurice Garin returned for the 1904 Tour de France but his title defence failed when he was disqualified. With the prize money that he won in 1903, which totalled 6,075 francs, (approximately US$40,000 and GBP£23,000 in 2006 values) Garin later bought a gas station, where he worked for the rest of his life.

== Bibliography ==
- Augendre, Jacques (2016). Guide historique [Historical guide] (PDF) (in French). Paris: Amaury Sport Organisation. Archived (PDF) from the original on 17 August 2016.
- McGann, Bill; McGann, Carol (2006). The Story of the Tour de France: 1903–1964. Vol. 1. Indianapolis, IN: Dog Ear Publishing. ISBN 978-1-59858-180-5.
- Thompson, Christopher S. (2006). The Tour de France: A Cultural History. Oakland, CA: University of California Press. ISBN 978-0-520-24760-4.
- Wheatcroft, Geoffrey (2007). Le Tour: A History of the Tour De France. New York City: Simon & Schuster. ISBN 978-1-84739-086-8.
- Woodland, Les (2003). The Yellow Jersey Companion to the Tour de France. London: Yellow Jersey Press. ISBN 978-0-224-06318-0.
