= Jean Fischer =

French cyclist

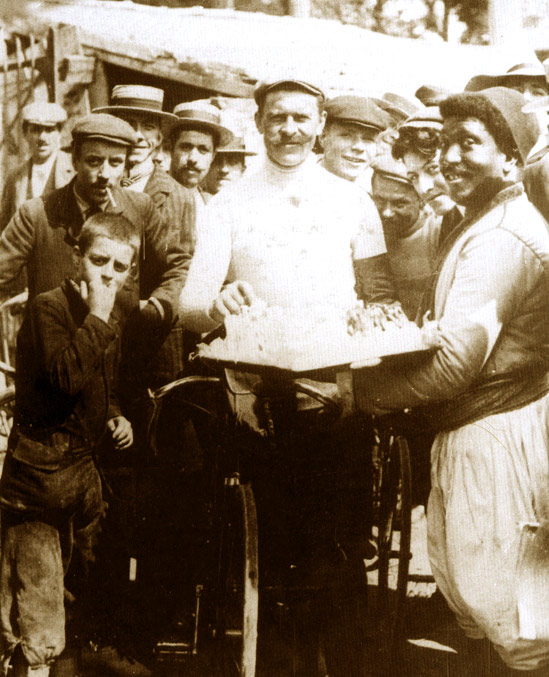

Personal information
- Full name: Jean-Baptiste Fischer
- Nickname: Le Grimpeur
- Born: 30 March 1867 Brunstatt, Haut-Rhin, France

Cycling career
- Sport: Cycling
- Discipline: Road
- Role: Rider

Professional teams
- 1903: La Française
- 1905: Peugeot

Major wins
- 1901 Paris–Tours

Jean-Baptiste Fischer was an early twentieth century French road racing cyclist who won the 1901 Paris–Tours and participated in the 1903 Tour de France, where he finished fifth.

== Palmarès ==
1901
Paris–Tours
Bordeaux- Paris: 3°
3rd Brussels–Roubaix

1902
Paris Roubaix: 6°

1903
Tour de France: 5°
