= The Beast Must Die =

The Beast Must Die can refer to:

- The Beast Must Die (novel), a 1938 novel by Cecil Day-Lewis, writing as Nicholas Blake
  - The Beast Must Die (1952 film) (La bestia debe morir) a 1952 Argentine film based on the Blake novel
  - Que la bête meure (AKA The Beast Must Die or This Man Must Die), a 1969 French film based on the Blake novel
  - The Beast Must Die (TV series), a 2021 British mini-series on BritBox based on the Blake novel
- The Beast Must Die (1974 film), a 1974 film based on a story by James Blish

== See also ==
- The Beast to Die, or 野獣死すべし, a 1980 Japanese film
