= The Deadly Joker =

1963 novel

- First edition (UK)
- Author: Cecil Day-Lewis
- Language: English
- Genre: Mystery
- Publisher: Collins Crime Club
- Publication date: 1963
- Publication place: United Kingdom
- Media type: Print

The Deadly Joker is a 1963 mystery novel by the Anglo-Irish writer Cecil Day-Lewis, under his pen name of Nicholas Blake. It was one of four stand-alone novels he wrote under the name alongside the Nigel Strangeways detective novels. It is unusual for the author for being written in a first person narrative from the perspective of the protagonist John Waterson.

== Synopsis ==
A man and his younger wife settle in the English countryside, but find the village is teeming with tensions. Things come to a head when one of the inhabitants is killed during a flower show.

== Bibliography ==
- Bargainnier, Earl F. Twelve Englishmen of Mystery. Popular Press, 1984.
- Reilly, John M. Twentieth Century Crime & Mystery Writers. Springer, 2015.
- Stanford, Peter. C Day-Lewis: A Life. A&C Black, 2007.
