= Susan Fox-Strangways =

British aristocrat

Lady Susannah Sarah Louisa Fox-Strangways
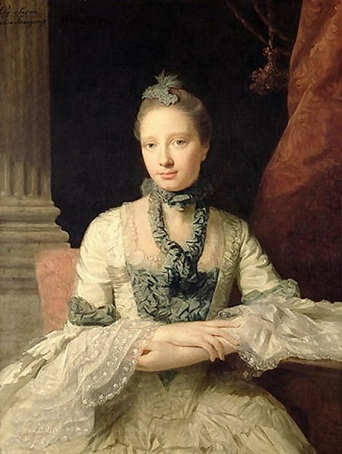
- Portrait of Lady Susan Fox-Strangways (1742-1827)
- Born: 1 February 1742
- Died: 9 August 1827 (aged 85); Stinsford, Dorset, England
- Resting place: St. Michael's, Stinsford, Dorset, England
- Spouse: William O'Brien (m. 1764)
- Parent(s): Stephen Fox-Strangways, 1st Earl of Ilchester, Elizabeth Fox, Countess of Ilchester
- Relatives: Henry Fox-Strangways, 2nd Earl of Ilchester (brother); Lady Christian Henrietta Carolina Fox-Strangways (sister); Henry Fox, 1st Baron Holland (uncle); Charles James Fox (cousin)

Lady Susannah Sarah Louisa Fox-Strangways (1742–1827) was a British aristocrat of the Fox-Strangways family. Her marriage to the Irish actor and playwright William O'Brien caused a public scandal.

== Early life ==
Fox-Strangways was born in 1742. She was the eldest child of her parents Stephen Fox-Strangways, 1st Earl of Ilchester and Elizabeth Fox, Countess of Ilchester (née Horner). Fox-Strangways was the childhood object of affection of her first cousin and future Whig statesman Charles James Fox (1749–1806), who in 1760 when a schoolboy at Eton College, composed a prize-winning Latin verse describing a pigeon he found to deliver his love-letters to her "to please both Venus its mistress and him". The scenario was captured in a painting by Joshua Reynolds which is held in the National Trust collection at Mount Stewart, County Down.

In her teenage years, Fox-Strangways was a popular socialite in London. She was close friends with Lady Sarah Lennox, whose elder sister Caroline Fox, 1st Baroness Holland had eloped with Fox-Strangways uncle Henry Fox, 1st Baron Holland.

== Marriage ==
Fox-Strangways met Irish actor William O'Brien, of David Garrick’s Drury Lane Theatre, in late 1760 to early 1761 when he was employed as a salaried elocution teacher at Holland House. He was described as "impossibly handsome." They exchanged poems as tokens of affection from late 1762 and Susan later admitted she initiated the letter correspondence with William.

Her family was outraged after they found out about her love affair with William, because the social standing of an actor was far below the standing of the family, and was considered "social suicide" for a lady to enter into a relationship with an actor at the time. It was considered a disgrace to the family, as the relationship would not only damage her own marriage prospects but also that of her sisters. Though her family tried to stop the relationship, they were unsuccessful as on 7 April 1764, Fox-Strangways and O'Brien eloped and married at St Pauls, Covent Garden.

When her family and relations found out about the secret marriage, her father was determined to cut all communications and her mother unhappily forgave her, but her sisters continued to stay in contact. The writer and politician Horace Walpole commented of the match "even a footman were preferable — the publicity of the hero's profession perpetuates the mortification".

O'Brien refused to give up his acting career as it was his only source of income, so Fox-Strangways and O'Brien agreed to escape to America, where they settled in New York for 6 years. However, the two struggled to find a source of income to sustain their standard of living in America, even with Lord Holland's allowance of £400 a year, as O'Brien was said to have "expensive taste". In 1770, they returned home to England against the wishes of Fox-Strangways' family. The two lived in various homes belonging to her family.

== Death ==
Fox-Strangways worked on the design and words of her husband's memorial after his death in 1815.

She died in 1827 and was buried with her husband at the church of St. Michael's at Stinsford.
