= St Michael's Church, Stinsford =

Church in Dorset, England

St Michael's Church
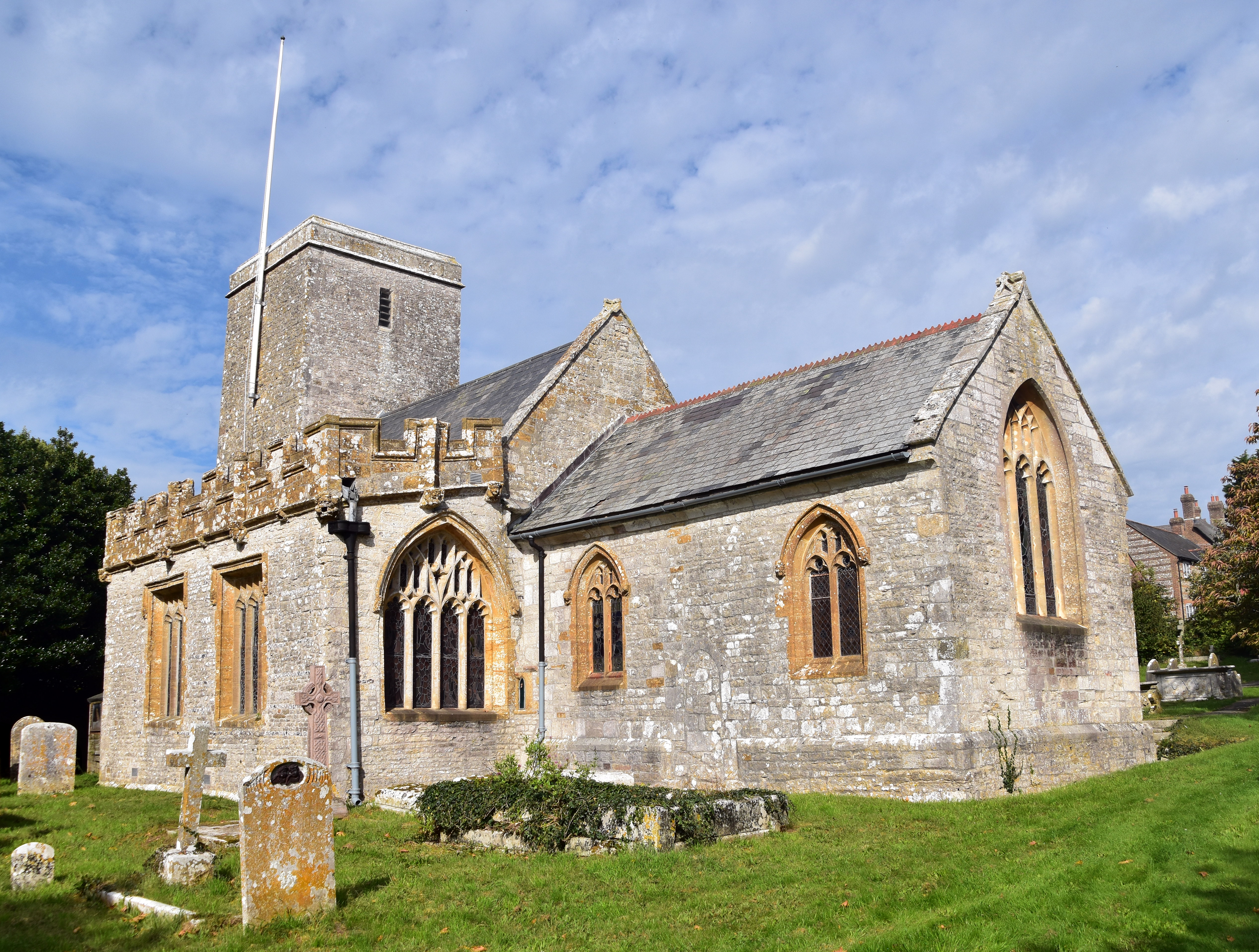

Religion
- Affiliation: Church of England
- Ecclesiastical or organizational status: Active

Location
- Location: Stinsford, Dorset, England
- Interactive map of St Michael's Church
- Coordinates: 50.7178°N 2.4102°W

Architecture
- Type: Church

St Michael's Church is a Church of England parish church at Stinsford, Dorset, England. The church has 13th century origins and is a Grade I listed building. It is known for its associations with the English novelist and poet Thomas Hardy, whose heart was buried there in 1928.

== History ==
A place of worship has been at the site of St Michael's Church since Anglo-Saxon times. The existing church has early 13th century origins, with the chancel and north and south arcades of the nave dating to this period, although the north arcade has since been rebuilt. The west tower was added in the early 14th century, followed by the north and south aisles in the 15th century. The north aisle was rebuilt in 1630.

The church underwent restoration and alterations in 1868 by the builders Messrs Wellspring of Dorchester under the direction of the Dorchester architect John Hicks. The work included adding new windows in the south aisle, the east end of the chancel and the east end of the aisles, and building a north vestry. A scheme of repairs and alterations followed in 1883, drawn up by the Dorchester architect G. J. Gregory and carried out by builders Messrs Davis & Son of Dorchester. The work included re-roofing much of the building. Another restoration was carried out in 1910, when the church was re-seated and re-floored. In 1990, the late Yale University professor Richard Little Purdy bequeathed £70,000 towards the maintenance of the church and the churchyard.

In 1995–96, a £35,000 scheme was carried out to rebuild the church's west gallery and install a new organ. Much of the original gallery was removed in 1843, following the replacement of the church musicians with a barrel organ two years earlier, and the remainder was removed in 1911. The cost of the scheme was covered by donations and fundraising. The gallery was designed by Roy Fewtrell of the John Stark and Crickmay Partnership and the organ was built by Brian Daniels of Chard.

== Architecture ==
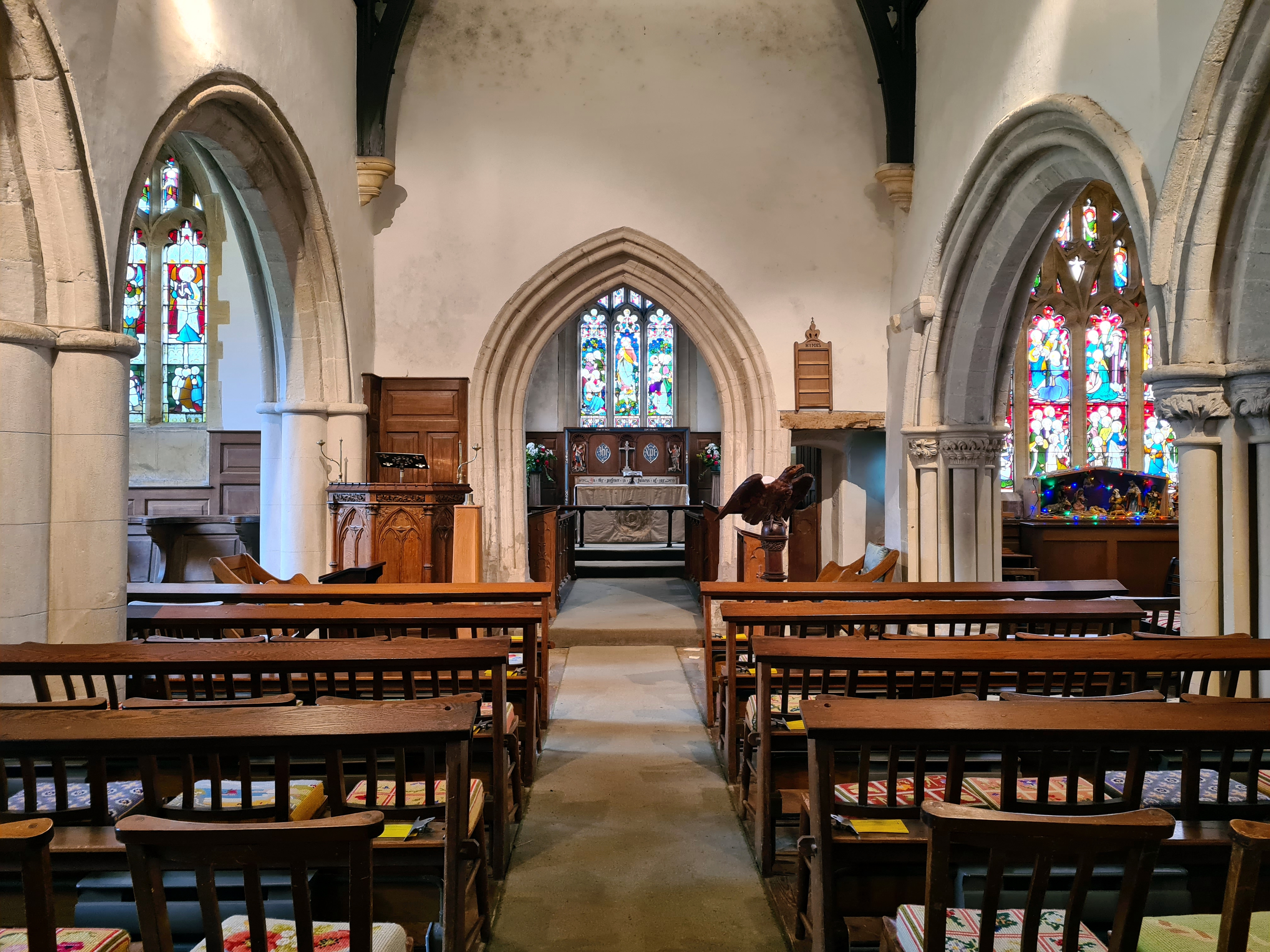
The interior of St Michael's Church.

St Michael's is built of roughly squared and coursed rubble stone, with ashlar dressings. It is made up of a nave, north and south aisles, chancel, west tower and north vestry. One of the most notable features of the church is a reset relief of an angel in the south aisle, dating to before the Norman Conquest of 1066. The two-stage tower contains three bells: one dated 1616, one by Thomas Purdue and dated 1663, and one of 15th century origin but recast in 1927. The square font in the nave dates to the late 12th century. The one that was in the north aisle until the 1940s was of early 18th century origin. The communion-plate of 1736 was made by Paul de Lamerie.

== Thomas Hardy connection ==
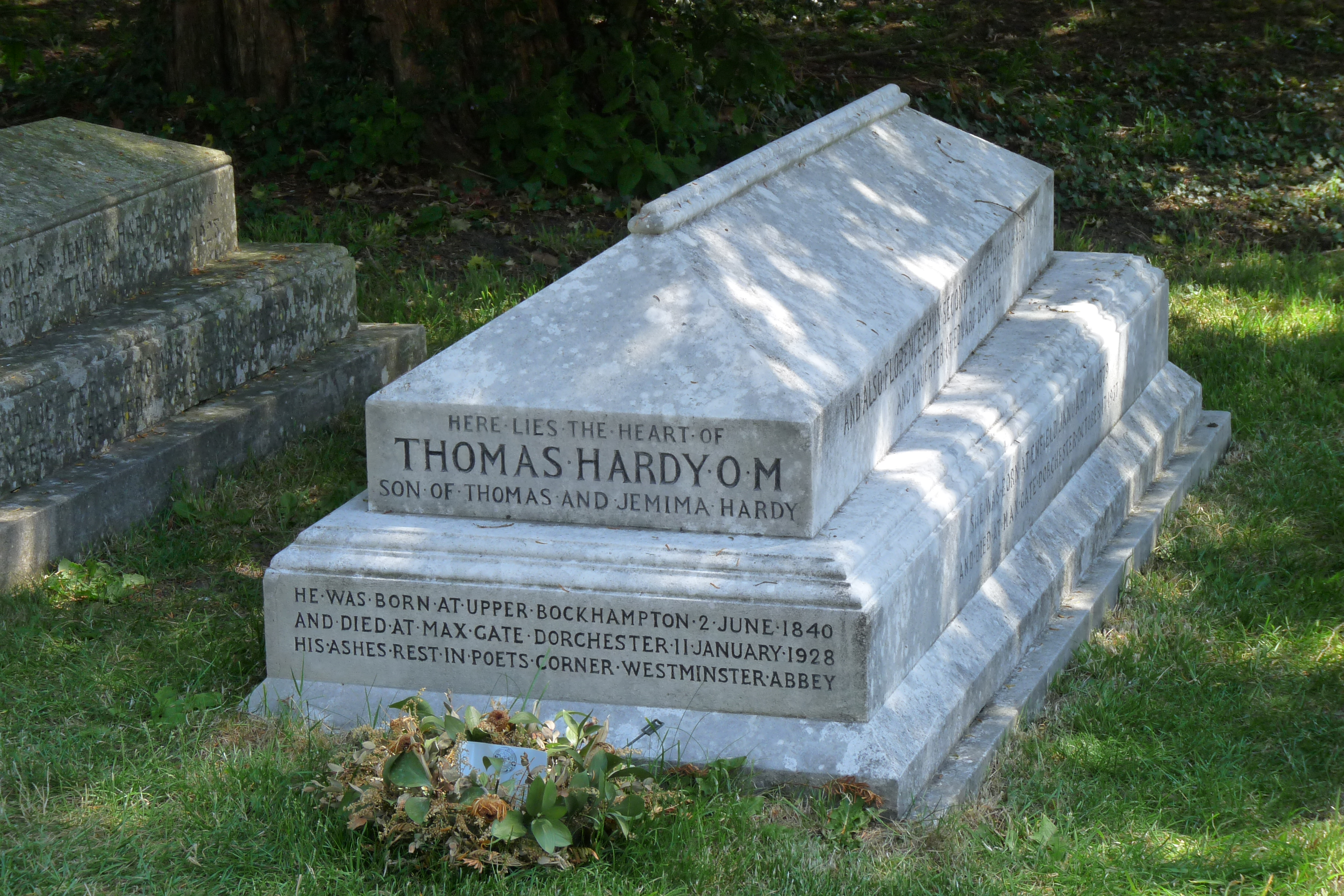
The grave of Thomas Hardy's heart in the churchyard.

St Michael's was the local church of novelist and poet Thomas Hardy and he was baptised here in 1840. Stinsford was the inspiration for 'Mellstock' in Hardy's novels Under the Greenwood Tree (1872) and Jude the Obscure (1895). Hardy's heart was buried in the churchyard in 1928, alongside the grave of his first wife, Emma Lavinia Gifford, who died in 1912. Hardy had wished for his body to be interred at Stinsford in the same grave as his first wife. His family and friends concurred; however, his executor, Sir Sydney Carlyle Cockerell, insisted that he be placed in Westminster Abbey's Poets' Corner. A compromise was reached whereby his heart was buried at Stinsford and his ashes in Poets' Corner. Hardy's second wife, Florence Dugdale, who died in 1937, his parents and other relatives are also buried in the churchyard.

A stained glass memorial window dedicated to Hardy was installed in the church in 1930. Designed and executed by Douglas Strachan, it represents Hardy's favourite passage in the Old Testament, 1 Kings 19. In 1931, Hardy's sister, Katharine, donated a new organ to the church in memory of her parents, sister Mary, and brothers Thomas and Henry. It was made by R. Spurden Rutt & Co. Ltd of Leyton. The organ was replaced with a new one in the church's new west gallery in 1996, but the front part remains on display in the chancel.

== Other notable burials ==
- Actor and dramatist William O'Brien, who died in 1815, and his wife Lady Susan Fox-Strangways, who died in 1827.
- American actress Mary Newcomb, who died in 1966.
- Poet Laureate Cecil Day-Lewis, who died in 1972, was buried close to Hardy whom he admired.

== Listed monuments ==
In the churchyard of St Michael's are the following Grade II listed monuments:

- William Jacob, headstone, dated 1585
- Unidentified stone table tomb, dated 1655
- John Cox, stone table tomb, 1693
- William Cox, stone table tomb, 1704
- Meaden and Betty his wife, stone table tomb, dated 1715
- Unidentified stone table tomb, early 18th century
- Thomas Brooks, headstone, 1749
- Martha Brooks, headstone, 1760
- Francis Cull, stone table tomb, 1839
- Thomas Hardy, headstone, 1837
- Mary Hardy, his wife, headstone, 1857
- James Hardy, headstone, 1880
- Jane Hardy, his wife, headstone, 1892
- Thomas Hardy, 1892, and Jemima his wife, 1904, coffin-type stone monument
- Emma Hardy, 1912, Thomas Hardy, 1928, Florence Hardy, 1937, coffin-type stone monument
- Mary Hardy, coffin-type stone monument, 1914
