= The Private Wound =

1968 novel

- First edition (UK)
- Author: Cecil Day-Lewis
- Language: English
- Genre: Thriller
- Publisher: Collins Crime Club
- Publication date: 1968
- Publication place: United Kingdom
- Media type: Print

The Private Wound is a 1968 mystery thriller novel by Cecil Day-Lewis, written under the pen name of Nicholas Blake. It was one of four stand-alone novels he wrote alongside the Nigel Strangeways detective novels. The title is taken from a line in William Shakespeare's Two Gentlemen of Verona. It was a runner-up for the Gold Dagger Award of the British Crime Writers' Association.

== Synopsis ==
Near the small Irish town of Charlottesville, the body of the free-spirited Harriet Leeson is found in a river. Her husband and lover both set out to seek the murderer.

== Bibliography ==
- Bargainnier, Earl F. Twelve Englishmen of Mystery. Popular Press, 1984.
- Reilly, John M. Twentieth Century Crime & Mystery Writers. Springer, 2015.
- Stanford, Peter. C Day-Lewis: A Life. A&C Black, 2007.
