= A Penknife in My Heart =

1958 novel

- First edition (UK)
- Author: Cecil Day-Lewis
- Language: English
- Genre: Thriller
- Publisher: Collins Crime Club
- Publication date: 1958
- Publication place: United Kingdom
- Media type: Print

A Penknife in My Heart is a 1958 crime thriller novel by Cecil Day-Lewis, written under the pen name of Nicholas Blake. It was one of four stand-alone novels he wrote alongside the Nigel Strangeways detective novels.

The plot is reminiscent of Patricia Highsmith's 1950 novel Strangers on a Train. In his preface to the novel Day-Lewis apologised for the similarity, explaining that he had neither read Highsmith's novel nor seen the subsequent film adaptation by Alfred Hitchcock. He thanked Highsmith "for being so charmingly sympathetic over the predicament in which the long arm of coincidence" placed him.

== Synopsis ==
Two men meet for the first time and find they both are in the same situation. Both desire someone to be murdered but fear being caught. They agree to swap killings, thereby giving each other perfect alibis.

== Bibliography ==
- Bargainnier, Earl F. Twelve Englishmen of Mystery. Popular Press, 1984.
- Malmgren, Carl Darryl. Anatomy of Murder: Mystery, Detective, and Crime Fiction. Popular Press, 2001.
- Reilly, John M. Twentieth Century Crime & Mystery Writers. Springer, 2015.
- Stanford, Peter. C Day-Lewis: A Life. A&C Black, 2007.
