= Tangled Web =

Tangled Web may refer to:

== Literature ==
- A Tangled Web (Montgomery novel), a 1931 novel by L. M. Montgomery
- A Tangled Web (Blake novel), a 1956 novel by Cecil Day-Lewis, written under the pen name of Nicholas Blake
- Spider-Man's Tangled Web, a 2001–2003 comic book series
- Tangled Webs, a novel by Elaine Cunningham
- "Oh, what a tangled web we weave/When first we practise to deceive!", a line from Marmion, an epic poem by Walter Scott

== Television ==
- "The Tangled Web", an episode of Yes, Prime Minister
- "A Tangled Web" (Degrassi High), a 1990 episode
- "Tangled Web" (Xiaolin Showdown), a 2003 episode
- "Tangled Web" (Your Friendly Neighborhood Spider-Man), a 2025 episode

== Other uses ==
- Operation Tangled Web, a raid conducted in 2007 by the U.S. Immigration and Customs Enforcement
