= The Beast Must Die (1952 film) =

- Directed by: Román Viñoly Barreto
- Written by: Narciso Ibáñez Menta; Román Viñoly Barreto
- Based on: The Beast Must Die by Cecil Day-Lewis
- Produced by: Laura Hidalgo; Román Viñoly Barreto
- Starring: Guillermo Battaglia; Narciso Ibáñez Menta; Warly Ceriani
- Cinematography: Alberto Etchebehere
- Edited by: José Serra
- Music by: Silvio Vernazza
- Production company: Argentina Sono Film
- Distributed by: Argentina Sono Film
- Release date: 28 May 1952
- Running time: 95 minutes
- Country: Argentina
- Language: Spanish

The Beast Must Die (Spanish: La bestia debe morir) is a 1952 Argentine thriller film of the classical era of Argentine cinema, directed by Román Viñoly Barreto and starring Laura Hidalgo Guillermo Battaglia and Narciso Ibáñez Menta. It based on the 1938 novel The Beast Must Die by Irish writer Cecil Day-Lewis, part of his series featuring the private detective Nigel Strangeways.

== Plot ==
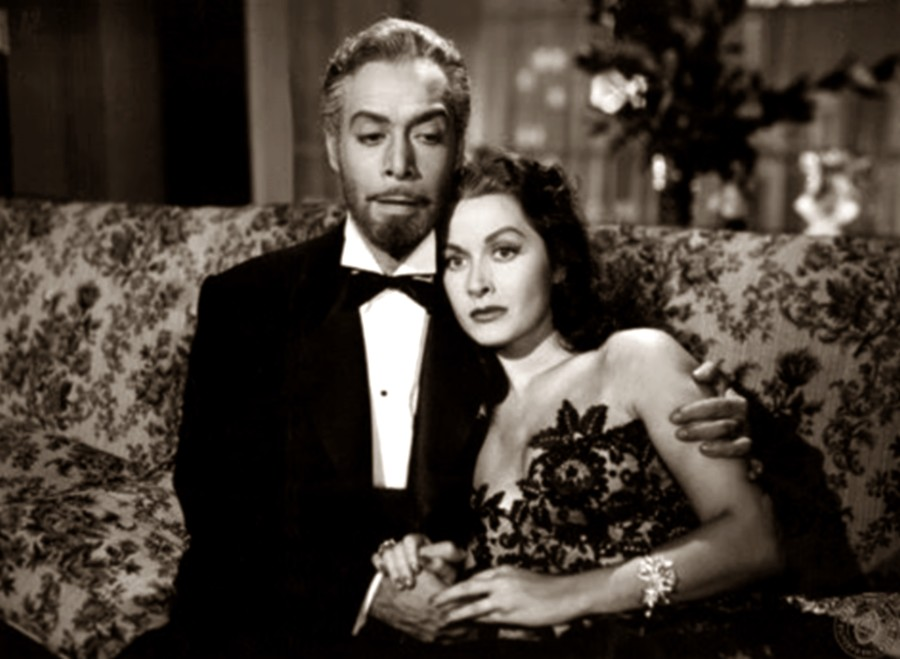
Laura Hidalgo and Narciso Ibáñez Menta

A writer of murder novels adopts a new identity to track down the hit-and-run driver who killed his son. Along the way he falls in love with a beautiful film star, and a series of disastrous complications take their course.

== Cast ==
- Narciso Ibáñez Menta as Felix Lane
- Laura Hidalgo as Linda Lawson
- Guillermo Battaglia as Jorge Rattery
- Milagros de la Vega as Sra. Rattery
- Nathán Pinzón as Carpax
- Ernesto Bianco as Nigel Strangeways
- Beba Bidart as Rhoda Carpax
- Josefa Goldar as Violeta Rattery
- Jesús Pampín as Inspector Blount
- Amalia Bernabé as Matilde
- Gloria Ferrandiz as Mujer de la cabaña
- Humberto Balado as Ronnie Hershey
- Ricardo Argemí as General Dixon
- Eduardo Moyano as Martie Carter
- Warly Ceriani as Guilder
- Ángel Eleta as Bailarín
- Marcelo Lavalle as Assistante de filmación
- Rafael Salvatore as Hombre en bar
