= The Sense of an Ending (film) =

2017 film by Ritesh Batra

- Poster
- Directed by: Ritesh Batra
- Written by: Nick Payne
- Based on: The Sense of an Ending by Julian Barnes
- Produced by: David M. Thompson; Ed Rubin
- Starring: Jim Broadbent; Charlotte Rampling; Harriet Walter; Emily Mortimer; Michelle Dockery; Billy Howle
- Cinematography: Christopher Ross
- Edited by: John F. Lyons
- Music by: Max Richter
- Production companies: FilmNation Entertainment; BBC Films; Origin Pictures
- Distributed by: StudioCanal (United Kingdom); Lionsgate; CBS Films (United States)
- Release dates: 2 January 2017 (Palm Springs); 10 March 2017 (United States); 14 April 2017 (United Kingdom)
- Running time: 108 minutes
- Countries: United Kingdom; United States
- Language: English
- Box office: $5 million

The Sense of an Ending is a 2017 mystery drama film directed by Ritesh Batra and written by Nick Payne, based on the 2011 novel of the same name by Julian Barnes. The film stars Jim Broadbent, Charlotte Rampling, Harriet Walter, Billy Howle, Emily Mortimer and Michelle Dockery.

The film had its world premiere at the Palm Springs International Film Festival on 2 January 2017. It was released in the United States on 10 March 2017, by CBS Films and Lionsgate, and in the United Kingdom on 14 April 2017, by StudioCanal.

== Plot ==
The story, told through Tony Webster's memories, and those of his friends, explores the imperfection and selectivity of memory, and the different recollections of past events, depending on the observer and the time since the event. Elements of the plot are used to compare the perhaps impossible problem of obtaining a definitive objective view of history with the similar difficulties involved in personal memory.

Elderly divorcé Anthony 'Tony' Webster runs a London camera shop and lives quietly. He receives a letter from the estate of Sarah Ford, the mother of his 1960s university girlfriend Veronica. To his surprise she has left him £500 and a diary, which is still with Veronica.

In a flashback, we hear that Tony's Sixth Form classmate Dobson died from what many believed to be suicide, after his girlfriend became pregnant. Tony's friend, the highly intelligent Adrian Finn, told their history teacher that in the absence of documentary evidence, nobody will ever know the true reason for his suicide.

Later, at the University of Bristol, Tony met Veronica, who introduced him to photography as a hobby. On a visit to her family, Veronica comes across as aloof, her brother and attractive mother both appear to flirt with him, with her mother Sarah warning him "not to let Veronica get away with too much".

Veronica later broke up with Tony, having never had full sexual intercourse with him - until after their breakup. He received a letter from Adrian requesting his blessing for his new relationship with Veronica. At first he decided to respond positively, but then wrote an angry reply, writing of her being damaged and how even her mother had warned him about her, and wishing they would have a child which would pay for its parents' sins.

Tony never heard back from either of them. His two best friends from Sixth Form later informed him that Adrian, who had seemed happy and in love at first, had committed suicide. Tony believed Veronica might have met Adrian through her brother Jack, who like Adrian studied at the University of Cambridge (but had previously told Tony he did not know Adrian), but they pointed out that Adrian and Veronica met through Tony.

In the present day, Tony tells his ex-wife Margaret about his relationship with Veronica for the first time. He then reconnects with his two Sixth Form friends and they help him locate Veronica online. She is still angry at him, has burned Adrian's diary, which might have explained why he committed suicide, but hands him the angry letter he himself had written to her and Adrian.

Spying on Veronica, Tony sees her with an intellectually disabled middle-aged man who bears a striking resemblance to, and is called, Adrian. He learns that the child is not Veronica's son but her younger half-brother, and guesses he is the son of Adrian and Veronica's mother, Sarah.

Tony's daughter Susie, whose pregnancy has been a subplot throughout the film, gives birth to a healthy boy. Tony writes to Veronica, apologising to her for what he did.

== Cast ==
- Jim Broadbent as Anthony 'Tony' Webster
  - Billy Howle as Young Tony Webster
- Charlotte Rampling as Veronica Ford
  - Freya Mavor as Young Veronica Ford
- Joe Alwyn as Adrian Finn
- Andrew Buckley as Adrian Jr.
- Peter Wight as Colin Simpson
  - Jack Loxton as Young Colin Simpson
- Hilton McRae as Alex Stuart
  - Timothy Innes as Young Alex Stuart
- Harriet Walter as Margaret, Tony's ex-wife
- Emily Mortimer as Sarah Ford, Veronica's mother
- Michelle Dockery as Susie Webster, Tony's daughter
- Matthew Goode as Mr. Joe Hunt, Tony's history teacher
- Edward Holcroft as Jack Ford, Veronica's brother
- James Wilby as David Ford, Veronica's father

== Production ==
On 8 February 2015, it was announced that Ritesh Batra would next direct a drama for Origin Pictures and BBC Films, based on the Julian Barnes' novel The Sense of an Ending, and scripted by Nick Payne. On 11 May 2015, Jim Broadbent was cast in the film for the lead role, which BBC Films and FilmNation Entertainment would be financing, and FilmNation also handling the international sales. David M. Thompson and Ed Rubin of Origin Pictures would finance the film. On 6 August 2015, an ensemble cast was announced including Charlotte Rampling, Harriet Walter, Emily Mortimer, Michelle Dockery, Billy Howle, Freya Mavor, and Joe Alwyn. Lipsync Productions would also co-finance the film along with BBC Films and FilmNation Entertainment. On 8 September 2015 CBS Films acquired the US distribution rights to the film.

=== Filming ===
Principal photography on the film began on 8 September 2015 in London and Bristol. Filming lasted for seven weeks.

== Release ==
It had its world premiere at the Palm Springs International Film Festival on 2 January 2017. The film was released in the United States on 10 March 2017 and in the United Kingdom on 14 April 2017.

== Reception ==
=== Box office ===
The Sense of an Ending grossed $2 million in the United States and Canada and $3 million in other territories for a worldwide total of $5 million.

=== Critical reception ===
On review aggregator Rotten Tomatoes, the film has an approval rating of 76% based on 119 reviews, with an average rating of 6.42/10. The site's critical consensus states, "Anchored by a strong starring performance by Jim Broadbent, The Sense of an Ending proves consistently gripping even as it skims the narrative surface of its literary source material." On Metacritic, the film holds a score of 61 out of 100, based on 24 critics, indicating "generally favorable reviews".

== See also ==
- The Myth of Sisyphus (Albert Camus's essay)
- Self-deception
