= Hemmerle =

Munich-based jeweller

Gebrüder Hemmerle GmbH & Co. KG
- Type: Kommanditgesellschaft
- Industry: High Jewellery
- Founded: 1893
- Founder: Joseph and Anton Hemmerle
- Headquarters: Munich, Germany
- Website: hemmerle.com

Hemmerle is a Munich-based jeweller founded in 1893 by brothers Joseph and Anton Hemmerle. The family-owned company originated as a manufacturer of medals and orders for the Bavarian royal court and later expanded into the production of contemporary jewellery. Pieces produced by the company are represented in museum collections and international exhibitions.

== History ==
Anton and Joseph Hemmerle established Hemmerle by taking over the established goldsmiths’ company Elchinger that produced medals and orders. In 1895, they were appointed 'Purveyor to the Court' by Luitpold, Prince Regent of Bavaria through a royal warrant of appointment to create medals for the Royal Bavarian Court, including the historic Bavarian Order of Merit, which Hemmerle continues to produce to this day since it was instituted in 1957. Hemmerle has also been responsible for producing the Bavarian Maximilian Order for Science and Art since 1905.

The Hemmerle boutique at 14 Maximilianstraße opened in 1904 and remained there for more than a century.

During the early 1990s, Stefan Hemmerle began experimenting with jewellery that departed from traditional precious-metal settings, a development influenced in part by client preferences and historical iron jewellery. In 1995, he designed a ring for the wife of an art collector, in response to her practice of wearing Berlin iron jewellery (which Germans received in exchange for donating their gold and silver jewels toward funding the War of Liberation). He set a diamond in textured iron rather than in gold or platinum. The combination of common metal with a precious stone was considered unusual at the time. This marked a shift in the workshop’s design direction. In 1995, the workshop expanded its production of contemporary jewellery design, introducing new material combinations and larger sculptural forms. In the mid-1990s, the workshop increasingly introduced materials such as iron, brass, copper, aluminium and wood into its jewellery production.

The company began presenting jewellery in the United States in the late 1990s through exhibitions and private viewing appointments in Palm Beach, Florida, and New York and from 2006 onwards, through temporary showrooms and private presentations in cities including New York, Hong Kong and Singapore. Since the 2010s, Hemmerle has presented jewellery at international art and design fairs including TEFAF Maastricht (since 1997), TEFAF New York (since 2016) and PAD London.

In 2024, Hemmerle relocated its Munich premises from Maximilianstraße 14 to a new space at Maximilianstraße 30, marking the first major change of location after more than a century at the original address. Through this relocation, the company replaced its previous ground-floor boutique with a new upstairs salon.

== Company structure ==
Hemmerle operates as a family-owned business managed by Christian Hemmerle, a descendant of the founding family, together with his wife Yasmin Hemmerle and the support of his parents Stefan and Sylveli Hemmerle.

The jewellery workshop itself is organised as a German limited partnership (Kommanditgesellschaft), while distribution activities are carried out through legally separate companies. These include Hemmerle Juweliere GmbH, which handles distribution in Europe, Asia, and the Gulf region and Hemmerle International GmbH, responsible for the North American market.

Jewellery production takes place in the company’s own Munich atelier, where pieces are handcrafted by a team of around twenty goldsmiths and jewellers.

=== Founding family ===
Stefan Hemmerle, who trained as a goldsmith and worked in several European countries, joined the family business in 1971 as a representative of the third generation and took over the management of the company together with his wife Sylveli Hemmerle.

Christian Hemmerle trained as a diamond cutter and studied business in London as well as at the Gemological Institute of America before joining the family business together with Yasmin Hemmerle in 2006. He took on a leading management role in the 2010s.

== Design ==
=== Materials and techniques ===
Hemmerle jewellery incorporates a range of gemstones, including orange-pink sapphires, green diamonds or conch pearls, as well as South China Sea Melo pearls or blue aquamarines from Brazil's Santa Maria mines. Works produced by the workshop combine precious stones with materials such as copper, iron, bronze, aluminium, steel and wood, creating contrasts between gemstones and industrial or organic materials.

The workshop has integrated non-traditional materials, including wood and historical artefacts and since 2010s anodised aluminium, into contemporary jewellery design. Antique diamonds and gemstones cut in earlier decades, including stones from the 1930s, are often incorporated, with designs often beginning from the selection of individual stones rather than a predetermined form.

Each piece is designed as a unique creation. Some designs feature reverse-set diamonds, in which stones are mounted upside down so that the pavé structure becomes part of the visible design. In some pieces and multi-stone designs, slight tonal differences between paired gemstones are retained as part of the visual composition rather than corrected through strict matching. Hemmerle's styles include the tassel earring, created using a traditional technique of knitting together cut stones often in bright colours into invisibly stitched strands. The technique involves hand-carved and hand-drilled gemstone beads that are knitted on silk into a mesh-like structure.

The workshop has described its design approach as reducing jewellery forms to geometric elements, drawing on references to natural structures as well as design movements such as Bauhaus and New Objectivity (Neue Sachlichkeit). Animal and botanical motifs appear in certain works through gemstone settings and metalwork. Hemmerle jewellery is regarded as contemporary. Some works reference architecture, nature, historical cultures and contemporary art.

Design concepts are typically developed collaboratively within the Munich workshop. Initial sketches outline materials and general form, while individual goldsmiths contribute to the interpretation during production, and single pieces may be developed over extended periods by one craftsperson. Jewellery is produced in limited quantities due to the time-intensive nature of the process, with individual works created rather than serial collections.

=== Collections and design projects ===
In 2011, Christian and Yasmin Hemmerle developed Delicious Jewels, a project centred on a vegetable-themed jewellery series. It was accompanied by a book of the same name, co-written by the Hemmerles with the chef and author Tamasin Day-Lewis, published by Prestel Publishing. The book accompanied Hemmerle’s vegetable-themed jewellery series and presented the pieces alongside recipes by Day-Lewis. The pieces included brooches and earrings modelled on vegetables such as aubergines, artichokes, cabbages, pumpkins, carrots and peas.

In 2014, the company designed a jewellery collection titled Nature's Jewels, consisting of twelve brooches, two pairs of earrings, a necklace and a ring, with themes of fruits, seeds, leaves and trees. In conjunction with the collection, the company also published a poetry book, Nature’s Jewels, through the art-book publisher Mack, with poems selected by Greta Bellamacina.

In 2016, Hemmerle announced The [AL] Project, a series of jewels exploring the properties of aluminium, previewed at TEFAF in Maastricht. The project includes more than 15 pairs of earrings and a brooch. The designs draw on themes including nature, minimalism and geometry. Aluminium is coloured through anodising, producing hues that complement the colours of the gemstones used in the pieces. In the same year, Hemmerle participated in the Beauty—Cooper Hewitt Design Triennial exhibition at the Cooper Hewitt, Smithsonian Design Museum in New York. This is the fifth instalment of the Triennial exhibition series.

In 2018, Hemmerle celebrated its 125th anniversary with two projects. The first was Hidden Treasures with 11 creations inspired by its past as a medal-maker and the second was the Revived Treasures project with a body of work that paid homage to Egyptian civilisation. This project included twenty-four one-of-a-kind creations, sixteen of which incorporated ancient Egyptian artifacts that were collected over the past decade, one creation incorporated a 19th century artifact and seven creations were inspired by Egyptian motifs and culture.

Infused Jewels is a 2022 jewellery project developed over four years and including thirteen one-off pieces. The works draw on botanical motifs inspired by ingredients associated with herbal tea, such as ginger flower, lavender, and cinnamon. The project involved collaborations with external partners, including Kräutergarten München (herb garden Munich), with whom a tea blend was developed, and the Nymphenburg Porcelain Manufactory, which produced porcelain elements and presentation objects accompanying the jewellery. An accompanying book was published by Hemmerle which includes an illustrated short story, The Herb Garden, written by Greta Bellamacina with illustrations by Rosanna Tasker. Presented at TEFAF Maastricht in 2022, Infused Jewels was described in the press as using materials such as aluminium, bronze and porcelain, continuing Hemmerle’s established design approach.

== Works in museum collections ==
Hemmerle's Harmony bangle was included in London's Victoria and Albert Museum in the permanent collection of the William and Judith Bollinger Jewellery Gallery in October 2010. Also, another version of the Harmony bangle, which celebrated its 30th anniversary in 2021, entered the permanent collection of the Cooper Hewitt, Smithsonian Design Museum in New York City in January 2013.

In 2019, a Bishop’s Pectoral Cross created by Hemmerle in 1900, joined the permanent collection of the Metropolitan Museum of Art, New York. The cross was designed by Hemmerle’s founders, brothers Joseph and Anton Hemmerle, for the Exposition Universelle of 1900 in Paris, where it was awarded as one of the show’s prizes.

In 2023, Hemmerle's sapphire and iron tassel earrings, which were part of the 125th anniversary project Hidden Treasures, joined the permanent collection of the Museum of Fine Arts, Boston. Crafted from iron, white gold, and over 200 carats of blue sapphires, the earrings feature tassels suspended from an iron element inspired by a Bavarian crown, reflecting Hemmerle’s origins as a maker of medals and orders. The piece is part of the museum’s Beyond Brilliance: Jewelry Highlights from the Collection installation in the Kaplan Family Foundation Gallery for Jewellery.

== Museum exhibitions (selection) ==
Hemmerle jewels have been part of numerous exhibitions including in Canada, the United States, Japan, Australia, France and the UAE, amongst others. Exhibitions include:

- 2006: Myths: Jewels today — Seen by Stefan Hemmerle, State Museum of Applied Arts and Design, Munich
- 2001—2008: Pearls, travelling exhibition
- 2008—2010: The Nature of Diamonds, travelling exhibition
- 2010: The Pearl Exhibition, Museum of Islamic Art, Doha, Qatar
- 2010—2011: Serpentina – die Schlange im Schmuck der Welt (Serpentina – the snake in the jewellery of the world), Schmuckmuseum, Pforzheim, Germany
- 2013—2014: Pearls, Victoria and Albert Museum, London, United Kingdom
- 2016: Beauty — Cooper Hewitt Design Triennial, Cooper Hewitt, Smithsonian Design Museum, New York, United States
- 2019: Animalia Fashion, Uffizi Gallery, Florence, Italy
- 2021: Beautiful Creatures: Jewellery Inspired by the Animal Kingdom, American Museum of Natural History, New York, United States

== Literature ==
=== Company Publications ===
- Hemmerle, Stefan (2006). Jewels Today. Munich: Collection Rolf Heyne. ISBN 978-3-89910-347-2.
- Hemmerle, Stefan (2009). Art of nature. Riehen. ISBN 978-3-85895-964-5.
- Hemmerle, Christian and Yasmin; Mack, Mihael; Whyte Duncan (2014). Natures Jewels. Munich. ISBN 978-1-907946-63-9.
- Day-Lewis, Tamasin; Hemmerle Juweliere GmbH (2011). Delicious Jewels. Munich, London: Prestel. ISBN 978-3-7913-5134-6.

=== Publications about the company ===
- Volandes, Stellene; Herrera, Carolina (2016). Jeweler: masters, mavericks, and visionaries of modern design. New York Paris London Milan: Rizzoli. ISBN 978-0-8478-4861-4.
- Grant, Melanie (2020). Coveted: Art and Innovation in High Jewelry. New York: Phaidon. ISBN 978-1-83866-149-6.
- Hardy, Joanna; Violette, Robert (2021). Sapphire: a celebration of colour. London; New York, New York: Thames & Hudson. p. 281. ISBN 978-0-500-02477-5.
- Reybaud, Fabienne (2022). Jewelry guide: the ultimate compendium. New York: Assouline. p. 201. ISBN 978-1-64980-041-1.
- Grant, Melanie (2025). The Jewelry Book. New York: Phaidon. ISBN 978-1-83866-778-8.
