= Under the Greenwood Tree =

1872 novel by Thomas Hardy

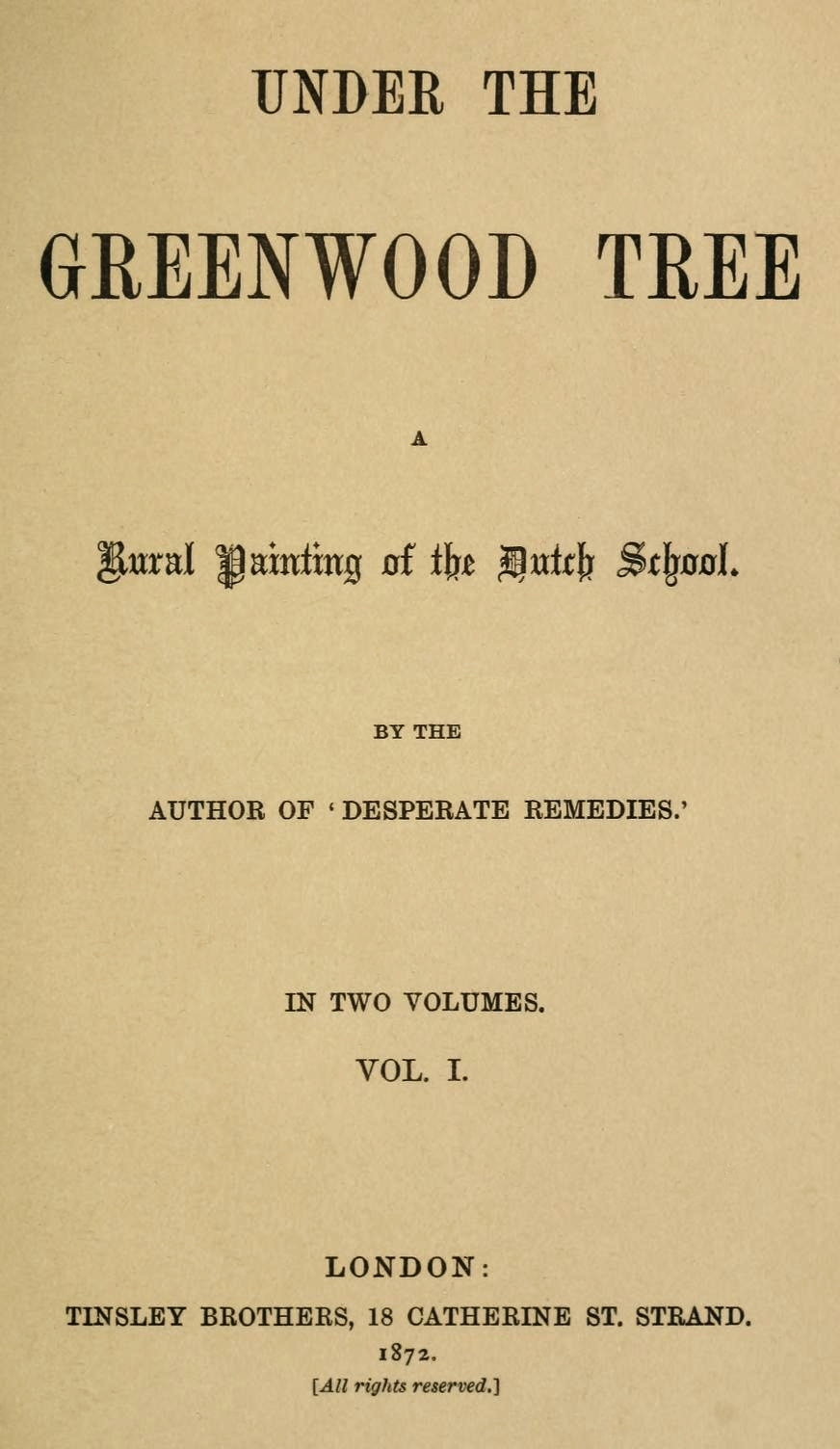
- First edition title page
- Author: Thomas Hardy
- Language: English
- Publisher: Tinsley Brothers
- Publication date: 1872
- Publication place: United Kingdom
- Media type: Print, two volumes

Under the Greenwood Tree: A Rural Painting of the Dutch School is the second published novel by the English author Thomas Hardy, published anonymously in 1872. It was Hardy's second published novel, and the first of what was to become his series of Wessex novels. Critics recognise it as an important precursor to his later tragic works, setting the scene for the Wessex that the author would return to again and again. Hardy himself called the story of the Mellstock Quire and its west-gallery musicians "a fairly true picture, at first hand, of the personages, ways, and customs which were common among such orchestral bodies in the villages of [the 1850s]".

== Plot ==
The novel follows the activities of a group of west gallery musicians, the Mellstock parish choir, one of whom, Dick Dewy, becomes romantically entangled with a comely new village schoolmistress, Fancy Day.

The novel opens with the fiddlers and singers of the choir — including Dick, his father Reuben Dewy, and grandfather William Dewy — making the rounds in Mellstock village on Christmas Eve. When the little band plays at the schoolhouse, young Dick falls for Fancy at first sight. Dick seeks to insinuate himself into her life and affections, but Fancy's beauty has gained her other suitors including Shiner, a rich farmer, and Mr Maybold, the new vicar at the parish church.

Maybold informs the choir that he intends Fancy, an accomplished organist, to replace their traditional gallery singing and string accompaniment to Sunday services. Reuben Dewy and the rest of the band visit the vicarage to negotiate, but reluctantly give way to the vicar's wishes.

Dick seems to win Fancy's heart, and the two become secretly engaged. When he is informed, Fancy's father is initially opposed, but changes his mind when as a consequence Fancy stops eating and her health deteriorates. Some months later, after Fancy's first Sunday service as organist, Maybold unexpectedly proposes marriage and promises Fancy a life of relative affluence; racked by guilt and temptation, she accepts. The next day, however, at a chance meeting with Dick, Maybold learns that Fancy is in fact already spoken for. Maybold writes her a letter, admonishing her to be honest with Dick and to withdraw her commitment to him if she indeed meant what she said in accepting Maybold. Fancy withdraws her consent to marry Maybold, and asks him to keep her initial acceptance forever a secret. Maybold again urges her to be honest with Dick about the episode.

The final chapter is a joyful and humorous portrait of Reuben, William, and the rest of the Mellstock rustics as they celebrate Dick and Fancy's wedding day. The novel concludes after the ceremony with Dick telling Fancy that their happiness must be due to there being such full confidence between them. He says that they will have no secrets from each other, "no secrets at all". Fancy replies "None from to-day" and, changing the subject, thinks "of a secret she would never tell".

== Principal characters ==
- Dick Dewy: a young member of the Mellstock Choir, in love with Fancy Day
- Fancy Day: the new teacher at the village school
- Mr Maybold: the new vicar of Mellstock
- Robert Penny: one of the choir, a boot and shoe-maker by profession
- Reuben Dewy: Dick's father, a tranter (carrier), the de facto leader of, and spokesman for, the Mellstock Choir
- William Dewy: Dick's grandfather
- Geoffrey Day: Fancy's father, gamekeeper and steward at one of the Earl of Wessex's outlying estates
- Frederic Shiner: a rich farmer in Mellstock, and Dick's rival in the courtship of Fancy.

== Background ==
Hardy began work on what would become the first of his Wessex novels, Under the Greenwood Tree in 1871, the genesis of the novel being a conflict between his grandfather's 'string choir' of viols and voices in Stinsford church, and a new vicar who was determined to replace the choir with an up-to-date organ. He modelled Mellstock on Stinsford, and the Dewys' house on his own family home in the hamlet of Upper Bockhampton (now Higher Bockhampton). Although the characters were not directly modelled on members of his family, he did make use of the fact that his sister Mary had trained as a schoolteacher. Writing forty years later, Hardy recalled "This story of the Mellstock Quire and its old established west-gallery musicians ... is intended to be a fairly true picture, at first hand, of the personages, ways, and customs which were common among such orchestral bodies in the villages of fifty or sixty years ago."

The book was originally to be called The Mellstock Quire, but during the summer of 1871 Hardy added significant additional material, de-emphasising the tribulations of the choir and focusing the plot on the love story between Dick and Fancy. With the new structure came a new title, Under the Greenwood Tree, taken from a song in Shakespeare's As You Like It (Act II, Scene V), and a subtitle, A Rural Painting of the Dutch School.

Having received a discouraging reply from Macmillan, to whom he offered the manuscript in 1871, Hardy accepted an offer from the ultimate publisher, Tinsley, of £30 for the copyright. Later, when Hardy had become more established, he attempted to retrieve the copyright but declined to pay Tinsley's quoted price of £300; the copyright was to remain with the publisher and his successors until after Hardy's death.

== Publication ==
Under the Greenwood Tree was published by Tinsley on 15 June 1872, with the author's name not appearing on the first edition. The novel was published in the United States in June 1873 by Holt & Williams, and was serialised there the following year. When the book was republished in the UK in 1912 by Macmillan, the full title became Under the Greenwood Tree, or, The Mellstock Quire: A Rural Painting of the Dutch School.

== Criticism and analysis ==
The book was well reviewed on its publication, receiving special praise for its freshness and originality.

Sometimes grouped with Hardy's lesser novels, Under the Greenwood Tree is also recognised by critics as an important precursor to his major works. In his 1872 review of the novel for the Saturday Review, the critic Horace Moule, one of Hardy's mentors and friends, called it a "prose idyll", and that judgement has stuck.

While the novel closes on an ambiguous and even sceptical note, it is nevertheless distinguished among Hardy's fiction—particularly his Wessex novels—for its relative happiness and amiability. For the critic Irving Howe, Under the Greenwood Tree served as a kind of necessary prequel and establishing myth for the world of Wessex that Hardy depicted in subsequent tragic works: the novel, he argued, "is a fragile evocation of a self-contained country world that in Hardy's later fiction will come to seem distant and unavailable, a social memory by which to judge the troubled present."

Hardy's 2006 biographer Claire Tomalin praised Hardy for the beauty and precision of his descriptive writing, and noted that the book has charmed generations of readers. Indeed, she said, there are always readers who go to him primarily to immerse themselves in "the Dorset woodlands, streams and rivers, fields and meadows, cottages and churches, soft skies and birdsong".

Tomalin considered the villagers to be drawn sympathetically, and with beautifully turned dialogue, but noted that the author rather distances the rustic characters, inviting the reader to smile with him at their simplicity. This was something that Hardy himself recognised, and in 1912 he wrote: "In rereading the narrative after a long interval there occurs the inevitable reflection that the realities out of which it was spun were material for another kind of study of this little group of church musicians than is found in the chapters here penned so lightly, even so farcically and flippantly at times. But circumstances would have rendered any aim at a deeper, more essential, more transcendent handling unadvisable at the date of writing."

== Adaptations ==
=== Film and TV ===
The story was adapted for a 1929 film, and for a 2005 BBC TV film (made in Jersey) with Keeley Hawes as Fancy Day and James Murray as Dick Dewy. (A 1918 US film of the same title is unconnected).

=== Stage ===
There have been several stage adaptations, including:

- a production by Patrick Garland at Salisbury Playhouse which transferred to the West End Vaudeville Theatre in 1978
- a production by Helen Davis that toured to a variety of locations in 2009 including Thame, Andover and Street
- a 2016 production by Jack Shepherd for New Hardy Players in Dorchester
- a Hammerpuzzle production that played at Gloucester and Cheltenham in 2019/20
- an opera by composer Paul Carr with libretto by Euan Tait adapted from the novel. The work was commissioned by Dorset Opera for their 50th anniversary, and first performed in July 2024 at the 2024 Dorset Opera Festival, directed by the composer.

== Bibliography ==
- Tomalin, Claire (2006). Thomas Hardy: The Time-Torn Man. London: Viking (Penguin Books). ISBN 978-0-670-91512-5.
