= Head of a Traveller =

1949 novel

- First edition (UK)
- Author: Cecil Day-Lewis
- Language: English
- Series: Nigel Strangeways
- Genre: Detective
- Publisher: Collins Crime Club
- Publication date: 1949
- Publication place: United Kingdom
- Media type: Print
- Preceded by: Minute for Murder
- Followed by: The Dreadful Hollow

Head of a Traveller is a 1949 detective novel by Cecil Day-Lewis, written under the pen name of Nicholas Blake. It is the ninth in a series of novels featuring the private detective Nigel Strangeways.

== Synopsis ==
When a headless corpse is found entangled in reeds on the River Thames close to the Oxfordshire home of celebrated poet Robert Seaton, Strangeways becomes involved in the case. Due to his admiration for Seaton he does everything he can to protect the family from the police investigation, but suspects the answer to the killing may lie in the great man's poetry.

== Bibliography ==
- Bargainnier, Earl F. Twelve Englishmen of Mystery. Popular Press, 1984. ISBN 978-0-87972-249-4.
- Reilly, John M. Twentieth Century Crime & Mystery Writers. Springer, 2015.
- Stanford, Peter. C Day-Lewis: A Life. A&C Black, 2007. ISBN 978-1-4411-2056-4.
