= Minute for Murder =

1947 novel

- First edition
- Author: Cecil Day-Lewis
- Language: English
- Series: Nigel Strangeways
- Genre: Crime
- Publisher: Collins Crime Club
- Publication date: 1947
- Publication place: United Kingdom
- Media type: Print
- Preceded by: The Case of the Abominable Snowman
- Followed by: Head of a Traveller

Minute for Murder is a 1947 crime novel by Cecil Day-Lewis, written under the pen name of Nicholas Blake. It is the eighth in a series of novels featuring the private detective Nigel Strangeways, and the first published following the Second World War. The hero begins the film employed at the Ministry of Morale, modelled on the Ministry of Information that Day-Lewis had worked for during wartime.

== Bibliography ==
- Stanford, Peter. C Day-Lewis: A Life. A&C Black, 2007.
