= MotherFatherSon =

British television series

- Genre: Drama; Thriller
- Created by: Tom Rob Smith
- Written by: Tom Rob Smith
- Directed by: James Kent; Charles Sturridge
- Starring: Richard Gere; Helen McCrory; Billy Howle
- Composers: Rob Lane; Will Rice
- Country of origin: United Kingdom
- Original language: English
- No. of series: 1
- No. of episodes: 8

Production
- Executive producers: Alan Poul; Hilary Salmon; Elizabeth Kilgarriff; Tom Rob Smith
- Producers: Sharon Bloom; Lisa Osborne
- Production locations: London; Spain
- Editor: Philip Kloss
- Running time: 60 minutes
- Production companies: BBC Studios; BBC Two Films

Original release
- Network: BBC Two
- Release: 6 March – 24 April 2019

MotherFatherSon is a British thriller television series starring Richard Gere – his first major television role – Helen McCrory, Billy Howle, Ciarán Hinds and Elena Anaya. The series broadcast on BBC Two began on 6 March 2019 and ended on 24 April 2019. It averaged 2.69 million viewers.

== Synopsis ==
"A fractured family at the heart of politics and power is pulled together under catastrophic circumstances."

== Cast and characters ==
- Richard Gere as Max Finch, American newspaper owner and Kathryn's ex-husband
- Helen McCrory as Kathryn Villiers, British heiress and Max's ex-wife
- Billy Howle as Caden Finch, 30-year-old son of Max and Kathryn
- Pippa Bennett-Warner as Lauren Elgood, senior adviser to Max
- Sinéad Cusack as Maggie Barns, journalist and ex-political correspondent for the National Reporter
- Diana Kent as Charlotte, Kathryn's mother
- Joseph Mawle as Scott Ruskin, who attends the homeless shelter where Kathryn visits and develops a close relationship with her
- Paul Ready as Nick Caplan, journalist for the National Reporter
- Danny Sapani as Jahan Zakari, first Muslim Prime Minister of the United Kingdom
- Sarah Lancashire as Angela Howard, Leader of the Opposition
- Ciarán Hinds as Walter Finch, Max's father
- Peter Sullivan as Tate, Max's head of security
- Steven Cree as Andrew Bentham
- Angélica Aragón as Verónica
- Elena Anaya as Sofia, Max's current wife
- Niamh Algar as Orla, Caden's girlfriend
- Richard Stoker as Charlotte's husband
- Nicolo Tucci as 17-year-old Max
- Theodore Emmerson Miller as 7-year-old Max

== Episodes ==
| No. | Title | Directed by | Written by | Original release date | U.K. viewers (millions) |
|---|---|---|---|---|---|
| 1 | Episode 1 | James Kent | Tom Rob Smith | 6 March 2019 | 4.53 |
| 2 | Episode 2 | James Kent | Tom Rob Smith | 13 March 2019 | 3.18 |
| 3 | Episode 3 | Charles Sturridge | Tom Rob Smith | 20 March 2019 | 2.55 |
| 4 | Episode 4 | Charles Sturridge | Tom Rob Smith | 27 March 2019 | 2.44 |
| 5 | Episode 5 | Charles Sturridge | Tom Rob Smith | 3 April 2019 | 2.39 |
| 6 | Episode 6 | Charles Sturridge | Tom Rob Smith | 10 April 2019 | 2.16 |
| 7 | Episode 7 | James Kent | Tom Rob Smith | 17 April 2019 | 2.21 |
| 8 | Episode 8 | James Kent | Tom Rob Smith | 24 April 2019 | 2.06 |

== Production ==
BBC Studios produced the series, which was Richard Gere's first TV role since appearing in Kojak in 1976. Promoting the upcoming project, Gere said, "It’s been almost 30 years since I worked in television. I'm so pleased to be working now with the BBC on this extraordinary eight-hour project with such talented people and which resonates so much to the time we live in". He seemed less enamoured of the project after filming, telling the UK's Radio Times magazine, "It was six months’ shooting, like doing four indie movies back to back but playing the same character. It’s too long. I don’t think I’ll do it again." Directed by James Kent, filming took place in summer 2018 in London and on location in Spain.

== Release ==
The series premiere was on BBC Two in March and April 2019. It will be distributed internationally by BBC Studios.
