= John Haidar =

Irish-Lebanese director and writer

- Born: John Haidar; Coventry, England
- Education: Trinity College, Cambridge Merton College, Oxford Royal Academy of Dramatic Art
- Occupation: Director–Writer
- Writing career
- Years active: 2013–Present

John Haidar is an Irish-Lebanese director, known for theatrical productions of Disco Pigs, Richard III and Hamlet. He is a former Associate Director of Headlong and Theatre Royal, Plymouth.

== Background ==
Haidar was born in England, though his mother is Irish and his father is Lebanese. He studied English Literature at Trinity College, Cambridge and Merton College, Oxford, where he wrote on Irish modernism. He is also a graduate of the Royal Academy of Dramatic Art.

== Career ==
Haidar's production of Hamlet at Bristol Old Vic, starring Billy Howle, Niamh Cusack and Mirren Mack, was listed in The Observer's 10 Best Shows of 2022. It was shown in UK and Ireland cinemas in 2023, produced by Altitude Films. In 2026, he is due to direct David Mamet's Pulitzer Prize-winning play Glengarry Glen Ross in Tokyo at Bunkamura.
