= The Beast Must Die (TV series) =

- Genre: Drama; Thriller
- Based on: The Beast Must Die by Nicholas Blake
- Developed by: Gaby Chiappe
- Written by: Gaby Chiappe
- Directed by: Dome Karukoski
- Starring: Cush Jumbo; Jared Harris; Billy Howle
- Composer: Matthew Herbert
- Country of origin: United Kingdom
- Original language: English
- No. of series: 1
- No. of episodes: 5

Production
- Executive producers: Marina Brackenbury; Emma Broughton; Gaby Chiappe; Arnon Milchan; Yariv Milchan; Nathaniel Parker; Ed Rubin; Michael Schaefer; David W. Zucker
- Producers: Sarada McDermott; Joanie Blaikie
- Cinematography: Joel Devlin
- Editors: Mike Jones; Dan Roberts
- Running time: 56–63 minutes
- Production companies: New Regency Television International; Scott Free Productions

Original release
- Network: BritBox
- Release: May 27 – June 17, 2021

The Beast Must Die is a British thriller television series based on the novel of the same name by Nicholas Blake, adapted for television by Gaby Chiappe. It concerns a mother's grief for her son who was killed in a car accident. She takes matters into her own hands by posing as a novelist to ingratiate herself into the family of the man whom she believes to be responsible for her son's death.

The series premiered in the United Kingdom on BritBox on 27 May 2021, and ran for one series of 5 episodes until 17 June 2021. A second series was in development, titled A Sword In My Bones. ITVX, which absorbed Britbox, announced it would not proceed. There had been earlier film adaptations of the original novel, including Que la bête meure (1969), by Claude Chabrol.

== Premise ==
Following the death of her son in a hit and run, all Frances Cairnes wants is to hunt down and kill the person she believes is responsible. When she believes she has tracked him down, she tricks her way into his house and plots his murder from within. Meantime, the new police inspector in the area has found out that his predecessor didn't do a thorough job with the original investigation, and is seeking answers himself.

== Cast and characters ==
- Cush Jumbo as Frances Cairnes
- Billy Howle as Nigel Strangeways
- Nathaniel Parker as Blount
- Maeve Dermody as Violet
- Douggie McMeekin as Vincent O'Brien
- Mia Tomlinson as Lena
- Geraldine James as Joy
- Jared Harris as George Rattery
- Barney Sayburn as Phil Rattery
- William Llande as Martie Cairnes

== Episodes ==
No.	Title	Directed by	Written by	Original release date
1	"Episode 1"	Dome Karukoski	Gaby Chiappe	May 27, 2021
2	"Episode 2"	Dome Karukoski	Gaby Chiappe	May 27, 2021
3	"Episode 3"	Dome Karukoski	Gaby Chiappe	June 3, 2021
4	"Episode 4"	Dome Karukoski	Gaby Chiappe	June 10, 2021
5	"Episode 5"	Dome Karukoski	Gaby Chiappe	June 17, 2021

== Production ==
The series was filmed on the Isle of Wight. Many of the scenes were filmed in the West Isle of Wight AONB, including Compton Farm, where adjacent scenes of the ‘island’ and the UK mainland were filmed at opposite ends of the same farm complex.

== Release ==
The miniseries premiered on May 27, 2021, on BritBox. It aired on AMC+ on July 5, 2021, and on AMC on July 12, 2021.

== Critical response ==
The Beast Must Die has received positive reviews from critics. On Rotten Tomatoes, the series holds an approval rating of 85% based on 20 critic reviews, with an average rating of 7.48/10. The website's critical consensus reads, "Cush Jumbo and Jared Harris make for thrilling combatants in The Beast Must Die, a coiled potboiler that excels with deft performances and rich atmosphere." On Metacritic, it has a score of 73 out of 100 based on 9 critics, indicating "Generally favorable".
