= A Question of Proof =

1935 novel

- First edition (UK)
- Author: Cecil Day-Lewis
- Language: English
- Series: Nigel Strangeways
- Genre: Detective
- Publisher: Collins Crime Club
- Publication date: 1935
- Publication place: United Kingdom
- Media type: Print
- Followed by: Thou Shell of Death

A Question of Proof is a 1935 detective novel by Cecil Day-Lewis, written under the pen name of Nicholas Blake. It is the first in a series of novels featuring the private detective Nigel Strangeways. Day-Lewis chose to write under an assumed name as he feared writing in the popular detective genre would harm his growing reputation as a serious-minded poet. Consequently, the publishers Collins advertised the book as being written by a "well-known writer" using a pen name. It was a commercial success selling around 200,000 copies in Britain and launching Day-Lewis, who quickly did become widely identified as the author, as one of the leading writers of the Golden Age of Detective Fiction.

== Synopsis ==
At Sudeley Hall preparatory school on sports day the body of Algernon Wyvern-Wemys, nephew of the headmaster and widely loathed throughout the school, is found dead in a haystack. When the police's suspicions fall on teacher Michael Evans who has been having an affair with the headmaster's wife, he asks his old friend from Oxford Nigel Strangeways to investigate the real culprit. He has his suspicions, but requires the necessary proof until a second murder is committed during a cricket match.

== Bibliography ==
- Reilly, John M. Twentieth Century Crime & Mystery Writers. Springer, 2015.
- Stanford, Peter. C Day-Lewis: A Life. A&C Black, 2007.
