= Billy Howle =

English actor

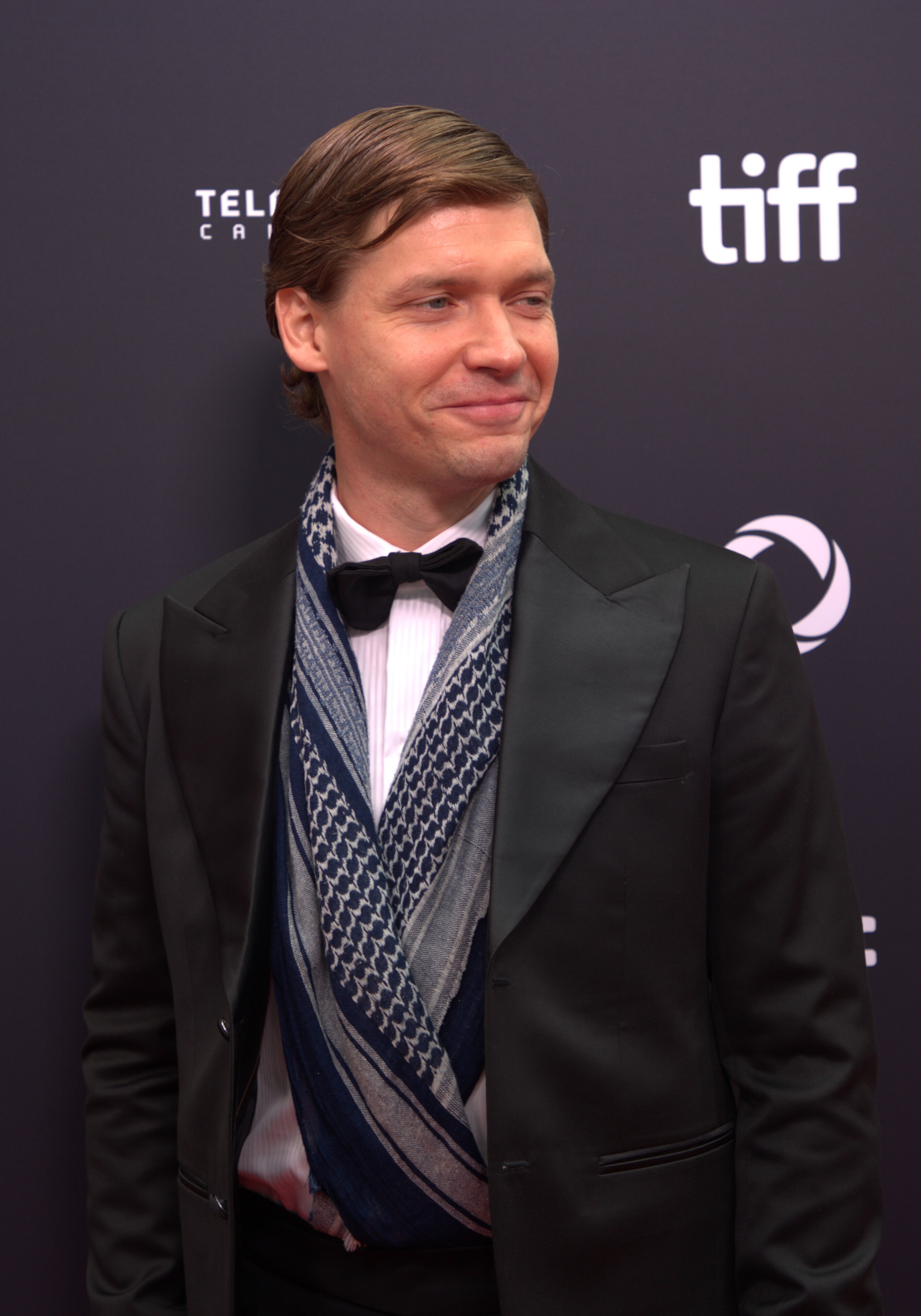
- Howle in 2025
- Born: William Walter Douglas Howle; Scarborough, North Yorkshire, England
- Education: Bristol Old Vic Theatre School
- Occupation: Actor
- Years active: 2014–present

William Walter Douglas Howle is an English actor. His films include On Chesil Beach (2017), The Seagull (2018), and Outlaw King (2018). On television, he is known for his roles in the E4 drama Glue (2014), MotherFatherSon (2019), the BBC miniseries The Serpent (2021), the BritBox thriller series The Beast Must Die (2021), and the Netflix mystery series The Perfect Couple (2024).

== Early life and education ==
William Walter Douglas Howle was born in Scarborough, North Yorkshire. His mother was a school teacher and his father was a composer.

Because of his father's profession, the family moved 12 times when Howle was a child, before settling in Scarborough. It was there that he became involved in the local music scene. At 18, he left home to study drama at the Bristol Old Vic Theatre School, before embarking on his career.

== Career ==
In 2014, Howle made his debut as James Warwick on the E4 television series Glue. He co-starred in the 2017 film The Sense of an Ending (as the younger version of Jim Broadbent's lead character) and the miniseries The Witness for the Prosecution in the pivotal role of the defendant in a murder case, Leonard Vole.

Howle appeared in the war film Dunkirk, and starred alongside Saoirse Ronan in the film On Chesil Beach, an adaptation of Ian McEwan's novel. He also appeared in the Netflix film Outlaw King.

Howle was the face of Prada S/S16, shot by Craig McDean in 2017, and appeared in the film adaptation of Anton Chekhov's The Seagull in the same year.

In 2019, Howle starred alongside Richard Gere and Helen McCrory in the BBC drama series MotherFatherSon, which was written by Tom Rob Smith. He made a cameo appearance in Star Wars: The Rise of Skywalker as Rey's father.

In 2021, he starred in the BBC series The Serpent as Herman Knippenberg, and on BritBox's The Beast Must Die as Nigel.

In February 2022, Howle starred in Chloe as Elliott, appearing in all six episodes. He also appeared in Under the Banner of Heaven as Allen Lafferty, who struggled his faith after his wife Brenda's (Daisy Edger-Jones) murder. In the latter part of 2022, Howle played the title role in John Haidar's production of Shakespeare's Hamlet. It was performed at the Bristol Old Vic.

In 2024, Howle portrayed a 1970s boxer in Kid Snow, and starred in the Netflix limited series The Perfect Couple as Benji Winbury, the son of the rich family. The long-delayed Sweet Dreams was set to start filming in October 2024. In October 2024, he performed on stage in a production of Look Back in Anger at the Almeida Theatre in London.

In May 2025, it was announced that Howle would star in a forthcoming World War II survival drama film titled Turret.

== Personal life ==
Howle is actively involved in Pro-Palestine causes and advocated for a ceasefire in the Gaza war. In September 2025, he signed an open pledge with Film Workers for Palestine pledging not to work with Israeli film institutions "that are implicated in genocide and apartheid against the Palestinian people."

== Filmography ==
=== Film ===
Year	Film	Role	Notes
2017	The Sense of an Ending	Young Tony Webster	
2017	Dunkirk	Petty Officer	
2017	On Chesil Beach	Edward Mayhew	
2018	The Seagull	Konstantin Treplyov	
2018	Outlaw King	Edward, Prince of Wales	
2019	Star Wars: The Rise of Skywalker	Dathan Palpatine	Cameo appearance (flashback)
2022	Infinite Storm	John	
2024	Kid Snow	Kid Snow	
2025	Palestine 36	Thomas Hopkins	

=== Television ===
Year	Film	Role	Notes
2014	Glue	James Warwick	8 episodes
2014	Vera	Billy	Episode: "Death of a Family Man"
2014	New Worlds	Joseph	2 episodes
2015	Cider with Rosie	Private James Harris	Television film
2016	The Witness for the Prosecution	Leonard Vole	2 episodes
2019	MotherFatherSon	Caden Finch	8 episodes
2020–2021	The Beast Must Die	Nigel Strangeways	5 episodes
2021	The Serpent	Herman Knippenberg	8 episodes
2022	Chloe	Elliot Fairbourne	Main role, miniseries
2022	Under the Banner of Heaven	Allen Lafferty	Main role, miniseries
2024	The Perfect Couple	Benji Winbury	Main role, miniseries
TBA	The Ministry of Time	Commander Graham Gore	Main role

=== Stage ===
- The Little Mermaid (2014)
- Ghosts (2015)
- Long Day's Journey Into Night, Bristol Old Vic (2016)
- Europe, Donmar Warehouse (2018)
- Hamlet, Bristol Old Vic (2022)
- Dear Octopus, National Theatre, Lyttelton (2024)
- Look Back in Anger, Almeida Theatre (2024)
- Roots, Almeida Theatre (2024)
