= The Dreadful Hollow =

1953 novel

- First edition
- Author: Cecil Day-Lewis
- Language: English
- Series: Nigel Strangeways
- Genre: Detective
- Publisher: Collins Crime Club
- Publication date: 1953
- Publication place: United Kingdom
- Media type: Print
- Preceded by: Head of a Traveller
- Followed by: The Whisper in the Gloom

The Dreadful Hollow is a 1953 detective novel by Cecil Day-Lewis, written under the pen name of Nicholas Blake. It is the tenth in a series of novels featuring the private detective Nigel Strangeways.

== Synopsis ==
After a series of poison pen letters in the Dorset village of Prior’s Umborne has led to a man taking his own life, Strangeways is called in by a wealthy local man to try and discover who is sending them. Before long, however, he has to deal with a second victim.

== Bibliography ==
- Reilly, John M. Twentieth Century Crime & Mystery Writers. Springer, 2015.
- Stanford, Peter. C Day-Lewis: A Life. A&C Black, 2007.
