= Malice in Wonderland (novel) =

1940 novel

- Author: Cecil Day-Lewis
- Language: English
- Series: Nigel Strangeways
- Genre: Detective
- Publisher: Collins Crime Club (UK); Harper & Brothers (US)
- Publication date: 1940
- Publication place: United Kingdom
- Media type: Print
- Preceded by: The Smiler with the Knife
- Followed by: The Case of the Abominable Snowman

Malice in Wonderland is a 1940 detective novel by the Irish-born British author Cecil Day-Lewis, written under the pen name of Nicholas Blake. It is the eighth in his series featuring the private detective Nigel Strangeways, one of the many investigators created during the Golden Age of Detective Fiction. Although published after the outbreak of the Second World War, it is set in the late pre-war era. It was released in the United States by Harvee using the alternative title The Summer Camp Mystery.

== Synopsis ==
In a train travelling to the new holiday camp of Wonderland on the English Coast, Paul Perry an undercover analyst for Mass Observation encounters his fellow holidaymakers the Thistlewaite Family, including the pompous but observant tailor father and his pretty, spirited daughter Sally with whom he strikes up a terse but mutually attracted relationship.

Not long after their arrival, a series of mishaps begin to occur. At first put down to a practical joker, the disruptions escalate, each with an echo of the plot of Lewis Carroll's Alice in Wonderland the motive is clearly malicious rather than playful. Eager to avoid the involvement of the police, the camp authorities try to deal with the situation themselves by finding out who is the anonymous "mad hatter". When this fails, they agree to Mr Thistlewaite's suggestion that the private detective Nigel Strangeways is called in to keep things discreet.

Strangeway's investigation is apparently like looking for a needle on a haystack with hundreds of new holidaymakers arriving ever week. While he shares the curiosity of Sally about an aged hermit who lives in the nearby woods, much of the evidence now appears to point towards Perry being the Mad Hatter. He begins to be paranoid that schizophrenia is making him commit the attacks. Only at a final showdown, resembling the Mad Hatter's tea party is Strangeways able to finally unmask the culprits.

== Bibliography ==
- Panek, LeRoy. Watteau's Shepherds: The Detective Novel in Britain, 1914-1940. Popular Press, 1979.
- Reilly, John M. Twentieth Century Crime & Mystery Writers. Springer, 2015.
- Stanford, Peter. C Day-Lewis: A Life. A&C Black, 2007.
