= A Tangled Web (Blake novel) =

1956 novel

- First edition (UK)
- Author: Cecil Day-Lewis
- Cover artist: 'Farnhill'
- Language: English
- Genre: Thriller
- Publisher: Collins Crime Club
- Publication date: 1956
- Publication place: United Kingdom
- Media type: Print

A Tangled Web is a 1956 British crime novel by Cecil Day-Lewis, written under the pen name of Nicholas Blake. It was one of four stand-alone novels he wrote under the name alongside the Nigel Strangeways detective novels. It was published by Harper in the United States under the alternative title Death and Daisy Bland.

== Synopsis ==
Daisy Bland, a country girl working in a London dress shop, encounters the charming Hugo Chesterman and they begin a relationship. She discovers that he is a cat burglar. However, when he is accused of a murder he didn't commit, her evidence unwittingly threatens to send him to the gallows.

== Bibliography ==
- Bargainnier, Earl F. Twelve Englishmen of Mystery. Popular Press, 1984.
- Reilly, John M. Twentieth Century Crime & Mystery Writers. Springer, 2015.
- Stanford, Peter. C Day-Lewis: A Life. A&C Black, 2007.
