= Jill Balcon =

British actress (1925–2009)

- Photographed by Mark Gerson, 1961
- Born: 3 January 1925; London, England
- Died: 18 July 2009 (aged 84); Petersfield, England
- Education: Royal Central School of Speech and Drama
- Occupation: Actress
- Years active: 1946–1999
- Spouse: Cecil Day-Lewis (m. 1951; died 1972)
- Children: Tamasin Day-Lewis; Daniel Day-Lewis
- Parents: Michael Balcon (father); Aileen Leatherman (mother)

Jill Angela Henriette Balcon (3 January 1925 – 18 July 2009) was a British actress. She was known for her work in film, television, radio and on stage. She made her film debut in Nicholas Nickleby (1947). She was the second wife of poet Cecil Day-Lewis; the couple had two children: Tamasin Day-Lewis became a food critic and TV chef and Daniel Day-Lewis is an actor.

== Life and career ==
Balcon was born in Westminster, London, the daughter of Aileen Freda Leatherman (1904–1988) and her husband Michael Balcon. Her family was Jewish, with 19th-century Lithuanian Jewish immigrant ancestors from what is now Latvia on her father's side and Poland on her mother's. Balcon attended Roedean School.

She trained at the Central School of Speech and Drama and, over the course of her career, performed on stage and in radio, film, and television. Her debut film was Nicholas Nickleby (1947). On 3 January 1948, she appeared on the BBC radio programme Time for Verse, where she had already become a favourite for her voice: "a rich, expressive, finely modulated instrument." That night, the Anglo-Irish poet Cecil Day-Lewis, who was 21 years her senior, also appeared on the show. That year Balcon worked for a season with the Bristol Old Vic.

Balcon and Day-Lewis began a relationship that year, complicated by his marriage to Mary Day-Lewis, who lived with their two teenage boys in Dorset, and his public affair with novelist Rosamond Lehmann, who lived in Oxfordshire. Day-Lewis eventually broke with both his wife and his mistress in order to be with Balcon. (Reputedly he was no more faithful to her than he had been to his first wife or Lehmann.)

Balcon starred opposite Stewart Granger in the film Saraband for Dead Lovers (1948), with Jean Kent in Good Time Girl (1948), and The Lost People (1950). But her first love was the stage.

In 1951, Balcon married Day-Lewis. Her father was deeply unhappy about the affair and Balcon being named publicly as co-respondent in Day-Lewis' divorce, and cut her off. After her marriage, she could see her mother only secretly.

Cecil Day-Lewis and Jill Balcon shared a great love for poetry and performed together in many public readings. They had two children together: Tamasin Day-Lewis, who became a documentary filmmaker/television chef and author of food books, and noted actor Daniel Day-Lewis. After the children were born, Balcon concentrated on acting in radio and TV productions, like Radio 4's Thirty Minute Theatre's ' Something's Burning ', in 1979, in order to have more manageable schedules.

Balcon died of a brain tumour at Petersfield Hospital in Hampshire on 18 July 2009, aged 84.
