= Tamasin Day-Lewis =

British chef (born 1953)

- Born: Lydia Tamasin Day-Lewis; 17 September 1953 (age 72); Hammersmith, London, England
- Occupations: Television chef, food critic
- Children: Miranda Shearer
- Parents: Cecil Day-Lewis (father); Jill Balcon (mother)
- Relatives: Michael Balcon (grandfather); Daniel Day-Lewis (brother)

Lydia Tamasin Day-Lewis (born 17 September 1953) is a British television chef and food critic, who has also published a dozen books about food, restaurants, recipes and places. She writes regularly for The Daily Telegraph, Vanity Fair, and Vogue.

== Biography ==
Day-Lewis was born in Hammersmith, London. Day-Lewis is the daughter of Anglo-Irish Protestant poet Cecil Day-Lewis, who served as Poet Laureate of the United Kingdom in his last years, and his second wife, British actress Jill Balcon. She is Jewish on her mother's side, a descendant of 19th-century immigrants from Poland and Lithuanian Jews from what is now Latvia. Her brothers are actor Sir Daniel, Nicholas and Sean Day-Lewis (who wrote a biography of their father). After attending Bedales School, she read English at King's College, Cambridge from 1973 until 1976.

She writes for The Daily Telegraph, Vanity Fair, Vogue and Food Illustrated.

She was a regular on the London Punk scene in the late 1970s.

She is currently on the Board of Governors at the Bristol Old Vic Theatre School.

In October 2012, Day-Lewis and her brother Daniel donated papers belonging to their father to Oxford University, including early drafts of his work and letters from figures such as actor John Gielgud and poets W. H. Auden, Robert Graves and Philip Larkin.

In 2011 she collaborated with Hemmerle and created the book Delicious Jewels published by Prestel.

== Bibliography ==
- The Englishwoman's Kitchen (Ed.) (1983) ISBN 0701126523
- Last Letters Home (1995) ISBN 0-333-64559-6
- West of Ireland Summers: A Cookbook (1997) ISBN 0-297-81858-9
- The Art of the Tart (2000) ISBN 0-304-35439-2
- Simply the Best: The Art of Seasonal Cooking (2001) ISBN 0-304-35654-9
- Good Tempered Food: Recipes to Love, Leave and Linger Over (2002) ISBN 0-297-84306-0
- Tarts with Tops on: Or How to Make the Perfect Pie (2004) ISBN 0-297-84376-1
- Tamasin's Weekend Food: Cooking to Come Home to (2004) ISBN 0-297-84364-8
- Tamasin's Kitchen Bible (2005) ISBN 0-297-84363-X
- Tamasin's Kitchen Classics (2006) ISBN 0-297-84428-8
- Where Shall We Go For Dinner?: A Food Romance (2007) ISBN 0-297-84429-6
- Supper for a Song (2009) ISBN 978-1-84400-743-1 Book Review
- All You Can Eat (2007) ISBN 978-0-297-84483-9
