= End of Chapter =

1957 novel

- First US edition
- Author: Cecil Day-Lewis
- Language: English
- Series: Nigel Strangeways
- Genre: Detective
- Publisher: Collins Crime Club (UK); Harper & Brothers (US)
- Publication date: 1957
- Publication place: United Kingdom
- Media type: Print
- Preceded by: The Whisper in the Gloom
- Followed by: The Widow's Cruise

End of Chapter is a 1957 detective novel by Cecil Day-Lewis, written under the pen name of Nicholas Blake. It is the twelfth in a series of novels featuring the private detective Nigel Strangeways.

== Synopsis ==
Strangeways is called in by the reputable publishing house Wenham and Geraldine to investigate a matter concerning a retired general, Richard Thoresby, whose wartime memoirs include controversial criticism of public figures. Thoresby had agreed to cut the pertinent sections, but they were mysteriously re-inserted during the publication process, exposing the publishers to action for libel. Suspects for tampering with the manuscript include partners Arthur Geraldine, Elizabeth Wenham, and Basil Rye; recently-sacked production manager Herbert Bates; and Stephen Protheroe, long-time editor for the firm but once a highly-regarded poet. Also on the premises is Millicent Miles, a popular author of romance novels making use of an office to write up her memoirs. Miles' son Cyprian Gleed, whose own literary ambitions have been frustrated, is a frequent visitor.

Interviews with the potential suspects and review of the evidence leave Strangeways in doubt that the case can be solved. In a sudden twist, however, Miles is murdered in her office, with evidence suggesting that the killer altered the text of the autobiographical manuscript on her desk. As the investigation proceeds it becomes evident that Miles was having an affair with Basil Rye. Strangeways, collaborating with Scotland Yard Inspector becomes convinced that the book tampering and the killing are linked, driven by events stretching back to the 1920s. The denouement takes place at Waterloo Station.

== Bibliography ==
- Bargainnier, Earl F. Twelve Englishmen of Mystery. Popular Press, 1984.
- Reilly, John M. Twentieth Century Crime & Mystery Writers. Springer, 2015.
- Stanford, Peter. C Day-Lewis: A Life. A&C Black, 2007.
