= The Whisper in the Gloom =

1954 novel

- First edition
- Author: Cecil Day-Lewis
- Language: English
- Series: Nigel Strangeways
- Genre: Detective
- Publisher: Collins Crime Club
- Publication date: 1954
- Publication place: United Kingdom
- Media type: Print
- Preceded by: The Dreadful Hollow
- Followed by: End of Chapter

The Whisper in the Gloom is a 1954 mystery thrillery detective novel by Cecil Day-Lewis, written under the pen name of Nicholas Blake. It is the eleventh in a series of novels featuring the private detective Nigel Strangeways. The novel introduced the recurring character of Clare Massinger, a young sculptor who becomes a romantic interest of Strangeways.

It was adapted into a 1980 American television film The Kids Who Knew Too Much produced by Disney. It relocated the setting of the action from London to Los Angeles and dropped the character of Strangeways from the plot.

== Synopsis ==
With an important Soviet delegation heading to London, a boy in Kensington Gardens accidentally stumbles across a plot to wreck Anglo-Russian relations.

== Bibliography ==
- Bargainnier, Earl F. Twelve Englishmen of Mystery. Popular Press, 1984.
- Reilly, John M. Twentieth Century Crime & Mystery Writers. Springer, 2015.
- Stanford, Peter. C Day-Lewis: A Life. A&C Black, 2007.
