= The Smiler with the Knife =

1939 novel

- Author: Cecil Day-Lewis
- Language: English
- Series: Nigel Strangeways
- Genre: Thriller
- Publisher: Collins Crime Club; Harper & Brothers (US)
- Publication date: 1939
- Publication place: United Kingdom
- Media type: Print
- Preceded by: The Beast Must Die
- Followed by: Malice in Wonderland

The Smiler with the Knife is a 1939 thriller novel by the Anglo-Irish writer Cecil Day-Lewis under the pen name Nicholas Blake. It is part of his series featuring the private detective Nigel Strangeways although the focus of the novel is primarily on his wife Georgia. The title is a line from The Knight's Tale by Geoffrey Chaucer. Written the year the Second World War broke out, it portrays a pre-war plot by aristocratic fascists to establish a dictatorship in Britain in alliance with the Axis powers. It was serialised in the News Chronicle over the summer of 1939. Orson Welles was interested in directing an adaptation of the novel as a film as part of his contract with RKO Pictures but was unable to get the project off the ground. Maurice Ashley wrote a positive review of the book in the Times Literary Supplement.

== Bibliography ==
- Ellis, Steve. British Writers and the Approach of World War II. Cambridge University Press, 2014.
- Gindin, James. British Fiction in the 1930s: The Dispiriting Decade. Springer, 2016.
- Hopkins, Lisa. Shakespearean Allusion in Crime Fiction: DCI Shakespeare. Springer, 2016.
- Reilly, John M. Twentieth Century Crime & Mystery Writers. Springer, 2015.
- Rippy, Marguerite H. Orson Welles and the Unfinished RKO Projects: A Postmodern Perspective. SIU Press, 2009.
- Stanford, Peter. C Day-Lewis: A Life. A&C Black, 2007.
