= The Widow's Cruise =

1959 novel

- First edition
- Author: Cecil Day-Lewis
- Language: English
- Series: Nigel Strangeways
- Genre: Detective
- Publisher: Collins Crime Club
- Publication date: 1959
- Publication place: United Kingdom
- Media type: Print
- Preceded by: End of Chapter
- Followed by: The Worm of Death

The Widow's Cruise is a 1959 British detective novel by Cecil Day-Lewis, written under the pen name of Nicholas Blake. It is the thirteenth in a series of novels featuring the private detective Nigel Strangeways.

== Synopsis ==
Strangeways and his friend the sculptress arrange to go on a cruise ship visiting the Greek Islands. Soon they become aware of the underlying tensions between their fellow passengers, before a murder is committed.

== Bibliography ==
- Bargainnier, Earl F. Twelve Englishmen of Mystery. Popular Press, 1984.
- Reilly, John M. Twentieth Century Crime & Mystery Writers. Springer, 2015.
- Stanford, Peter. C Day-Lewis: A Life. A&C Black, 2007.
