= The Morning after Death =

1966 novel

- First edition
- Author: Cecil Day-Lewis
- Language: English
- Series: Nigel Strangeways
- Genre: Detective
- Publisher: Collins Crime Club
- Publication date: 1966
- Publication place: United Kingdom
- Media type: Print
- Preceded by: The Sad Variety

The Morning after Death is a 1966 detective novel by Cecil Day-Lewis, written under the pen name of Nicholas Blake. It is the sixteenth and last entry in the series of novels featuring the private detective Nigel Strangeways.

== Synopsis ==
Strangeways is in America visiting the Ivy League Cabot University near Boston to do some research. When the body of a classics professor is found stuffed into a locker, he is reluctantly drawn into the murder investigation.

== Bibliography ==
- Reilly, John M. Twentieth Century Crime & Mystery Writers. Springer, 2015.
- Stanford, Peter. C Day-Lewis: A Life. A&C Black, 2007.
