= The Case of the Abominable Snowman =

1941 novel

- First edition Collins Crime Club cover.
- Author: Cecil Day-Lewis
- Language: English
- Series: Nigel Strangeways
- Genre: Detective
- Publisher: Collins Crime Club (UK); Harper & Brothers (US)
- Publication date: 1941
- Publication place: United Kingdom
- Media type: Print
- Preceded by: Malice in Wonderland
- Followed by: Minute for Murder

The Case of the Abominable Snowman is a 1941 detective novel by Cecil Day-Lewis, written under the pen name of Nicholas Blake. It is the seventh in a series of novels featuring the private detective Nigel Strangeways. Day-Lewis, best known as a poet, also wrote a number of mysteries during the Golden Age of Detective Fiction. Although in some respects a traditional 1930s country house mystery, it makes passing references to Second World War features such as the blackouts. Although published in 1941, it was written and set in 1940 during the Phoney War era. It was published in the United States under the alternative title The Corpse in the Snowman.

== Synopsis ==
Nigel Strangeways and his explorer wife Georgia are summoned from their Devon home in deepest winter by one of her elderly relations who invites to come and spend Christmas with her in rural Essex. She has been concerned by strange goings on at nearby Easterham Manor where three siblings and their various guests have gathered. The strange behaviour of a cat one night, suggests that he was either possessed or drugged by narcotics. The very night that Nigel first visits the manor, the owner's younger sister is found hanging in her bedroom naked. Questions remain whether it is suicide or murder, with Nigel and Scotland Yard leaning towards the latter. All the visitors to the household come under suspicion, including an elusive doctor treating her for the effects of cocaine addiction. However, the solution to the case appears to be contained by a recently built snowman on the estate.

== Critical reception ==
Writing in a contemporary review in The New Statesman, Ralph Partridge felt that the novel was "written with great competence, some wit and a faint tone of condescension - a combination we have learnt to expect from the author."

== Bibliography ==
- Grindin, James. British Fiction in the 1930s: The Dispiriting Decade. Springer, 2016.
- Hopkins, Lisa. Shakespearean Allusion in Crime Fiction: DCI Shakespeare. Springer, 2016.
- Reilly, John M. Twentieth Century Crime & Mystery Writers. Springer, 2015.
- Stanford, Peter. C Day-Lewis: A Life. A&C Black, 2007.
