= Thou Shell of Death =

1936 novel

- Title page for Thou Shell of Death (1936)
- Author: Cecil Day-Lewis
- Language: English
- Series: Nigel Strangeways
- Genre: Detective
- Publisher: Collins Crime Club; Harper & Brothers (US)
- Publication date: 1936
- Publication place: United Kingdom
- Media type: Print
- Preceded by: A Question of Proof
- Followed by: There's Trouble Brewing

Thou Shell of Death is a 1936 detective novel by the British author Cecil Day-Lewis, written under the pen name of Nicholas Blake. It is the second in a series of novels featuring the private detective Nigel Strangeways. It was published during the Golden Age of Detective Fiction and features a country house mystery. The title is a quote from the Jacobean play The Revenger's Tragedy.

== Bibliography ==
- Scaggs, John. Crime Fiction. Psychology Press, 2005.
- Reilly, John M. Twentieth Century Crime & Mystery Writers. Springer, 2015.
- Stanford, Peter. C Day-Lewis: A Life. A&C Black, 2007.
