= William O'Brien (actor) =

Irish actor and playwright

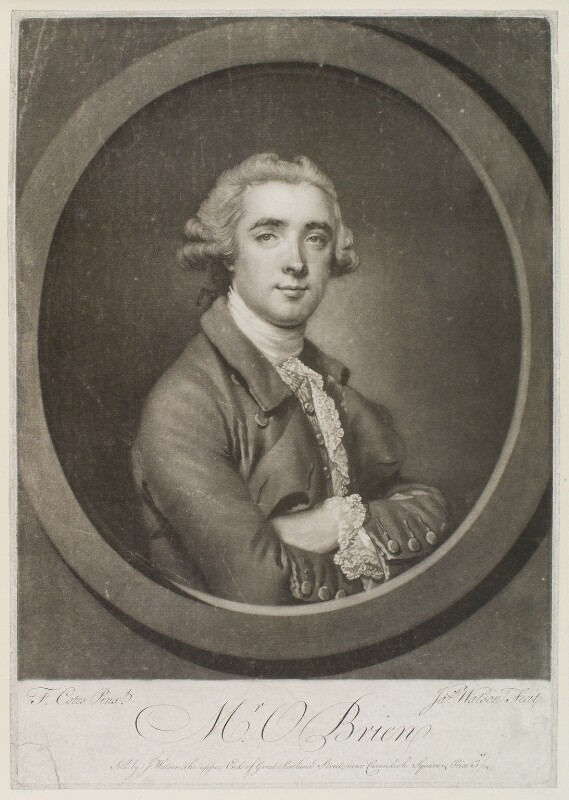
William O'Brien, ca. 1765

William O'Brien (c.1740–1815) was an Irish actor and playwright.

== Career ==
William O'Brien was probably born in County Clare in about 1740 to a family which claimed a distant connection to the Viscounts Clare. His father was a fencing master in Dublin. David Garrick brought O'Brien over to London from Dublin in 1758 to join his actor's company at Drury Lane. O'Brien was successful in a number of roles, particularly Shakespeare and contemporary comedies. He eloped with Lady Susannah "Susan" Fox-Strangways, eldest daughter of Stephen Fox, the first Earl of Ilchester, whom he had met when they both performed in amateur theatricals at Holland House. Their marriage, which took place on 7 April 1764 at St. Paul's, Covent Garden, was disapproved of by Lady Susan's family.

Following the marriage, O'Brien retired from the stage. The couple were forced for a time to travel to North America, because of the social scandal caused by their elopement. They set sail for New York in September 1764. Although neither husband nor wife were happy there, they travelled widely, sailing up the Hudson, travelling west to Niagara Falls, and then north to Quebec where O'Brien briefly served as a barrack master. In 1768, he was gazetted Secretary and Provost-Master-General of the Bermudas.

On their return to England in 1770, the O'Briens lived for a time in London where O'Brien entered a brief but unsuccessful career as a playwright. He was the author of two plays, Cross-Purposes (1772) and The Duel (1773). The diarist James Boswell described O'Brien as "a lively little fellow, but priggish" and "quite the fine man about town".

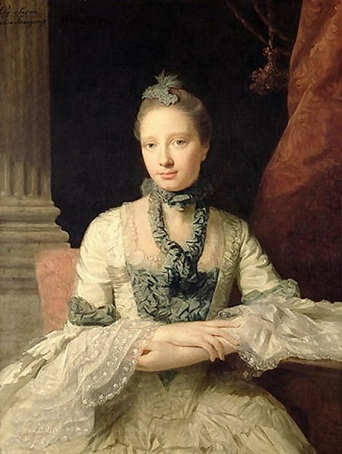
Lady Susan O'Brien (1743 – 1827), ca. 1761.

The O'Briens later moved to live at a Strangways family property, Stinsford House, in Dorset. The couple had no children. O'Brien served as Receiver-General of Dorset until shortly before his death in 1815. O'Brien and Lady Susan were buried together at the church of St Michael's at Stinsford.

== In popular culture ==
Nicholas Irons portrayed O'Brien in the 1999 TV miniseries Aristocrats.

== Bibliography ==
- Cross purposes: a farce of two acts, as it is performed at the Theatre-Royal in Covent-Garden (1772).
- The Duel (1773).
