= The Worm of Death =

1961 novel

- First edition (UK)
- Author: Cecil Day-Lewis
- Language: English
- Series: Nigel Strangeways
- Genre: Detective
- Publisher: Collins Crime Club
- Publication date: 1961
- Publication place: United Kingdom
- Media type: Print
- Preceded by: The Widow's Cruise
- Followed by: The Sad Variety

The Worm of Death is a 1961 detective novel by the Anglo-Irish writer Cecil Day-Lewis, written under the pen name of Nicholas Blake. It is the fourteenth in a series of novels featuring the private detective Nigel Strangeways.

== Synopsis ==
When Doctor Piers Loudron disappears from his Greenwich home and turns up soon afterwards dead in the River Thames, his family calls in the services of Strangeways to protect their interests during the police investigation.

== Bibliography ==
- Reilly, John M. Twentieth Century Crime & Mystery Writers. Springer, 2015.
- Stanford, Peter. C Day-Lewis: A Life. A&C Black, 2007.
