= The Sad Variety =

1964 novel

- First edition
- Author: Cecil Day-Lewis
- Language: English
- Series: Nigel Strangeways
- Genre: Thriller
- Publisher: Collins Crime Club
- Publication date: 1964
- Publication place: United Kingdom
- Media type: Print
- Preceded by: The Worm of Death
- Followed by: The Morning after Death

The Sad Variety is a 1964 thriller novel written by the Anglo-Irish writer Cecil Day-Lewis, written under the pen name of Nicholas Blake. It is the fifteenth and penultimate entry into the series featuring the private detective Nigel Strangeways. It marked a move away from the murder mysteries of the earlier novels into the then-fashionable spy novel genre.

== Synopsis ==
Strangeways is called in by the Security Service to protect a professor, whose recent discovery makes him a target for Soviet intelligence, and his daughter. The action takes place in a country hotel in wintery Dorset.

== Bibliography ==
- Stanford, Peter. C Day-Lewis: A Life. A&C Black, 2007.
