= There's Trouble Brewing =

1937 novel

- First edition (UK)
- Author: Cecil Day-Lewis
- Language: English
- Series: Nigel Strangeways
- Genre: Detective
- Publisher: Collins Crime Club (UK); Harper & Brothers (US)
- Publication date: 1937
- Publication place: United Kingdom
- Media type: Print
- Preceded by: Thou Shell of Death
- Followed by: The Beast Must Die

There's Trouble Brewing is a 1937 detective novel by Cecil Day-Lewis, written under the pen name of Nicholas Blake. It is the third in a series of novels featuring the private detective Nigel Strangeways.

== Synopsis ==
Strangeways is invited to the small town of Maiden Astbury to give a talk to the literary society on a book he has recently written on historic poetry. There he encounters the domineering and tyrannical owner of the local brewery Eustace Bunnett, who hires him to investigate the death of his pet dog Truffles in one of the brewery's copper vats. The very next day a body appearing to be Bunnett's turns up at the same spot.

== Bibliography ==
- Reilly, John M. Twentieth Century Crime & Mystery Writers. Springer, 2015.
- Stanford, Peter. C Day-Lewis: A Life. A&C Black, 2007.
