= The Beast Must Die (novel) =

1938 novel by Cecil Day-Lewis

- First edition (US)
- Author: Cecil Day-Lewis
- Language: English
- Series: Nigel Strangeways
- Genre: Detective
- Publisher: Collins Crime Club (UK); Harper & Brothers (US)
- Publication date: 1938
- Publication place: United Kingdom
- Media type: Print
- Preceded by: There's Trouble Brewing
- Followed by: The Smiler with the Knife

The Beast Must Die is a 1938 detective novel by Cecil Day-Lewis, written under the pen name of Nicholas Blake. It combines elements of the inverted thriller with a classic Golden Age-style investigation. It is the fourth in a series of novels featuring the private detective Nigel Strangeways. The title is inspired by a line in Four Serious Songs by Johannes Brahms, itself a reference to Ecclesiastes.

== Synopsis ==
After his young son is run down and killed by a speeding car in the Gloucestershire village where he lives, mystery novelist Frank Cairnes is angry when the police fail to trace the culprit. For some time, he has been planning to murder the man responsible as soon as he has the opportunity, whatever the consequences. Deciding to investigate on his own, he finds out by chance that the passenger in the car is a rising film actress, Lena Lawson. Pretending to be writing a new novel set in a film studio, he meets Lena in London posing under his pen name Felix Lane. After a courtship, he manages to gain an invitation to stay with her at the house of her brother-in-law George Rattery in Gloucestershire.

Now certain that Rattery, a wealthy and unpleasant bully, is the man who killed his son, Cairnes plots his revenge. After discovering that Rattery cannot swim, he goads him into coming sailing with him on a stormy day. Complications ensue and the plan goes awry, Rattery able to walk away in apparent triumph. Only a few hours later, however, he collapses after dinner and dies almost instantly of poison. Knowing that he will be the prime suspect, Cairnes calls in the private detective Nigel Strangeways to clear him of the murder.

== Adaptations ==
The novel was adapted as a film twice: a 1952 Argentine film (The Beast Must Die, directed by Román Viñoly Barreto and starring Laura Hidalgo), and a 1969 film (This Man Must Die, directed by Claude Chabrol and starring Michel Duchaussoy and Caroline Cellier). In addition, it was the basis of a 2021 British television series (The Beast Must Die).

== Bibliography ==
- Goble, Alan. The Complete Index to Literary Sources in Film. Walter de Gruyter, 1999.
- Hopkins, Lisa. Shakespearean Allusion in Crime Fiction: DCI Shakespeare. Springer, 2016.
- Reilly, John M. Twentieth Century Crime & Mystery Writers. Springer, 2015.
- Stanford, Peter. C Day-Lewis: A Life. A&C Black, 2007.
