= Stinsford =

Village in Dorset, England

Coordinates: 50.7181°N 2.4101°W

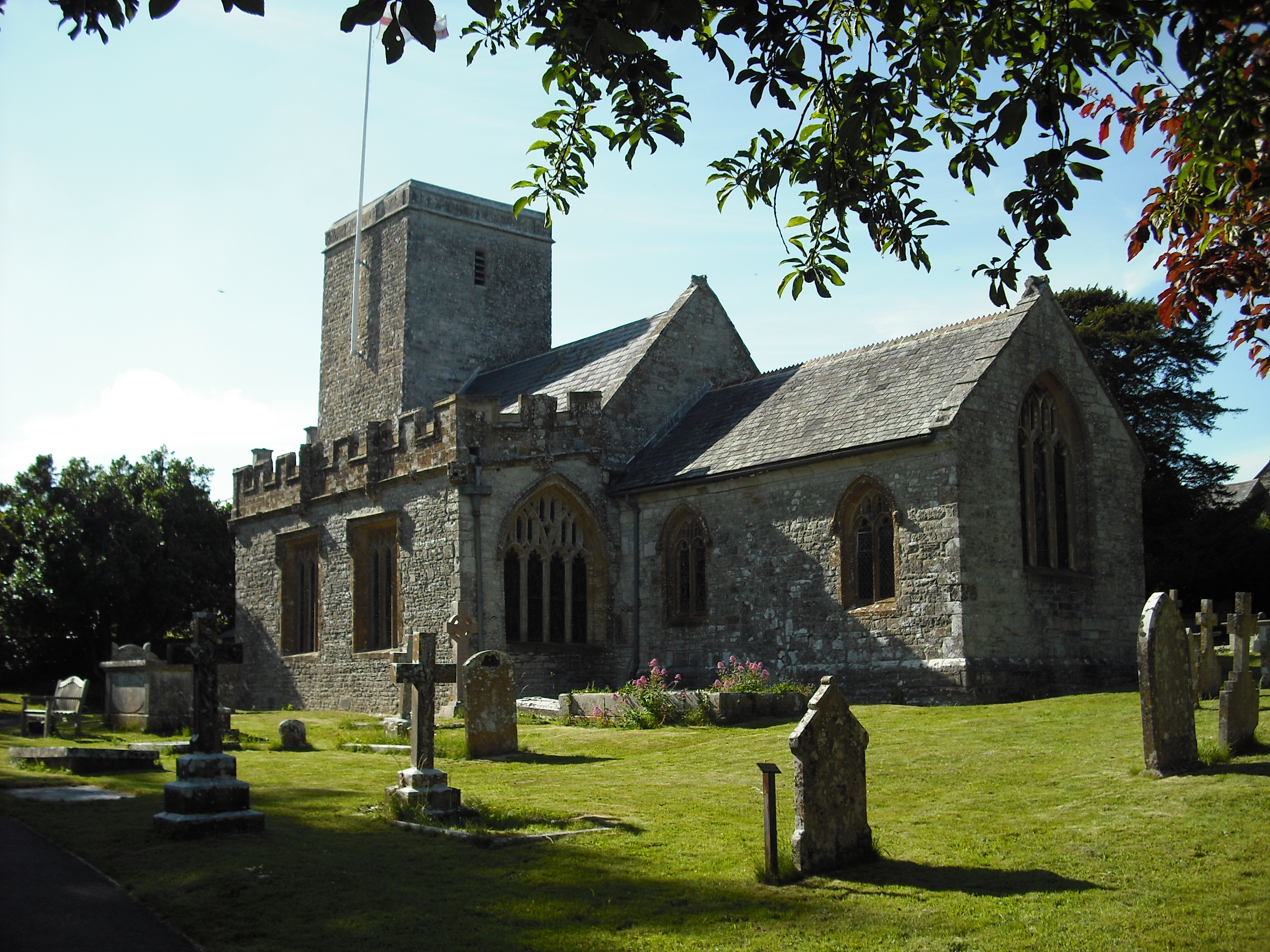
- St Michael's Church, Stinsford

- Location within Dorset
- Population: 334
- OS grid reference: SY712911
- Civil parish: Stinsford
- Unitary authority: Dorset
- Ceremonial county: Dorset
- Region: South West
- Country: England
- Sovereign state: United Kingdom
- Post town: Dorchester
- Postcode district: DT2
- Dialling code: 01305
- Police: Dorset
- Fire: Dorset and Wiltshire
- Ambulance: South Western
- UK Parliament: West Dorset

Stinsford is a village and civil parish in southwest Dorset, England, about 1 mile (1.6 km) east of Dorchester. The parish includes the settlements of Higher and Lower Bockhampton. The name Stinsford may derive from stynt, Old English for a limited area of pasture. In the 2011 United Kingdom census, the parish had a population of 334.

The parish has five large country houses - Birkin House, Frome House, Kingston Maurward House, the Elizabethan era Old Manor House and Stinsford House. Much of the land in the parish is occupied by Kingston Maurward College, a further education college.

== St Michael's Church ==
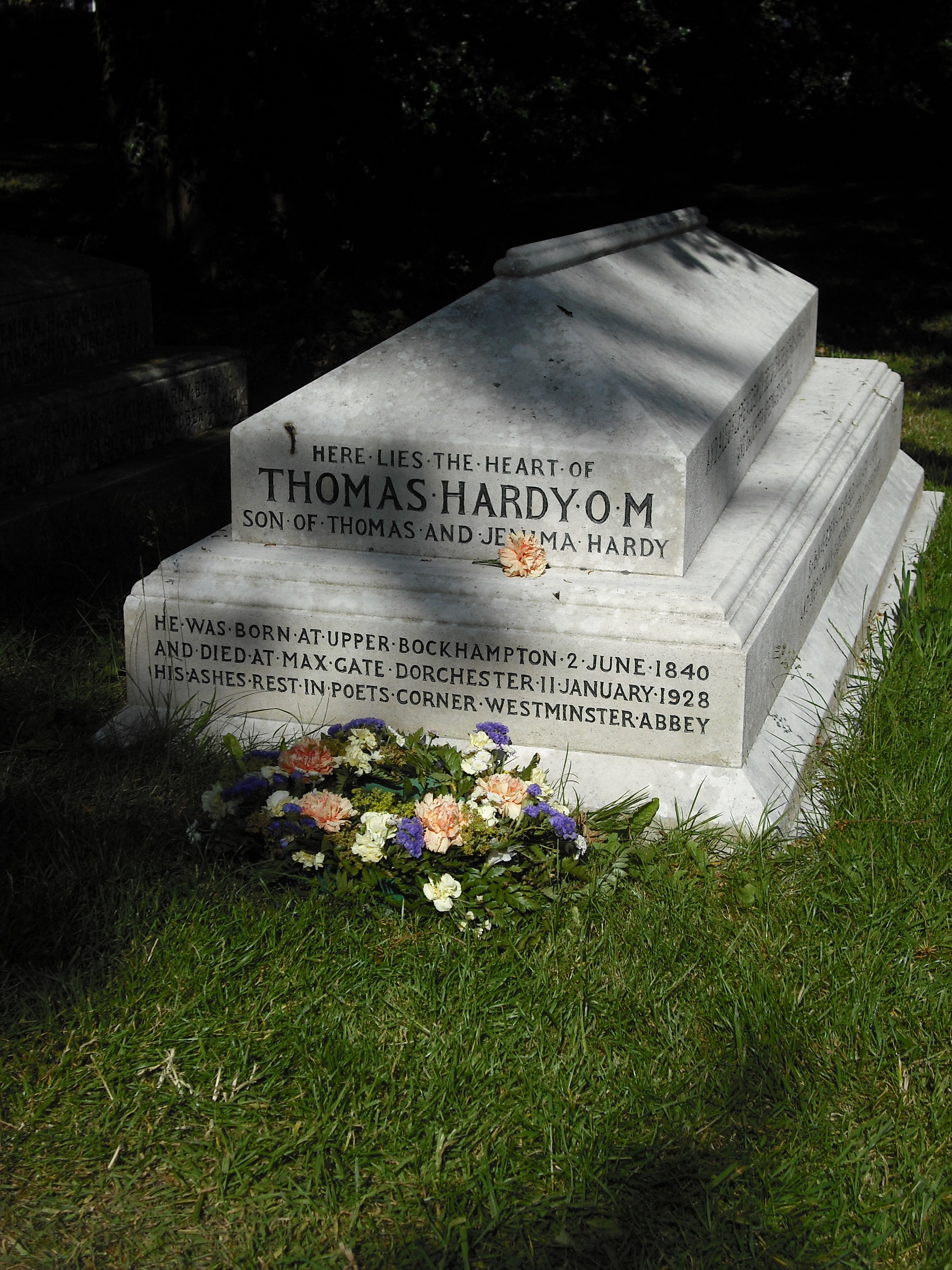
Thomas Hardy's monument

There has been worship at the site since at least Norman times, but the only remaining parts of the earliest structure are the sculpture of St Michael, inside the west wall of the south aisle, and the restored Purbeck Marble font.

St Michael's was the local church of novelist and poet Thomas Hardy and he was baptised here. Stinsford is the original 'Mellstock' of Hardy's novels Under the Greenwood Tree and Jude the Obscure. Hardy's heart was buried in the churchyard in 1928, alongside the grave of his first wife, Emma Lavinia Gifford, who died in 1912 and his second wife, Florence Dugdale, who died in 1937.

The churchyard also contains the grave of Poet Laureate Cecil Day-Lewis, who died in 1972 and had arranged for his burial to be close to Hardy whom he admired. Also here are the remains of the actor and dramatist William O'Brien (died 1815) and his wife Lady Susan Fox-Strangways.

== Football ==
Stinsford has a six-a-side football team which plays in the Dorset six-a-side leagues. The team is noted for its luminous orange strip and has provided players who have later moved on to play for football teams such as Yeovil Town F.C.
