= This Man Must Die =

1969 film by Claude Chabrol

- French theatrical release poster
- Directed by: Claude Chabrol
- Written by: Claude Chabrol; Paul Gégauff
- Based on: The Beast Must Die by Cecil Day-Lewis
- Produced by: André Génovès
- Starring: Michel Duchaussoy; Caroline Cellier; Jean Yanne
- Cinematography: Jean Rabier
- Edited by: Jacques Gaillard
- Music by: Pierre Jansen
- Distributed by: Compagnie Française de Distribution Cinématographique (CFDC)
- Release dates: 5 September 1969 (France); 20 October 1970 (New York)
- Running time: 110 minutes
- Countries: France; Italy
- Language: French

This Man Must Die (French: Que la bête meure), also titled Killer! in the UK, is a 1969 French–Italian psychological thriller film directed by Claude Chabrol. It is based on the 1938 novel The Beast Must Die by Cecil Day-Lewis, writing as Nicholas Blake. The story follows a widower who, obsessed with revenge after his only son is killed in a hit-and-run incident, tracks down the driver with the intent to kill him.

== Plot ==
Returning from the beach, Charles Thénier's young son Michel is killed by a hit-and-run driver in a sports car. Charles vows to have his revenge, keeping a journal in which he states his intention to kill the offender once he finds him.

The police investigation is fruitless. Charles thinks the guilty party may run a garage, since there is no record of a car going in for repairs. By chance, while pursuing this hunch, he discovers that the actress Hélène Lanson was the passenger in a car that was damaged on the day of his son's death. Using his pen-name Marc Andrieux, he seduces her and discovers that the driver was her brother-in-law Paul Decourt. Hélène confesses that she has had depressive anxiety recently. Charles presses her to explain more but couldn't get more information. Eventually he overcomes Hélène's reluctance and arranges a trip for both of them to visit her sister's family in Brittany.

Charles discovers that Paul is detestable, cruel to his wife and hated by his teenage son Philippe. He also observes that Paul is a terrible womanizer and confirms that Hélène once slept with Paul. He has conflicting thoughts as to whether or not he will kill Paul but, although hesitatingly, rescues him from a cliff-fall. Philippe confides to Charles his own desire to kill his father.

Charles decides to kill Paul in a staged sailing accident and buys a boat for that purpose. However, while at sea, Paul pulls a gun on him and reveals that he has read Charles's journal and passed it to his solicitor to take to the police should something happen to him. After returning to the harbour, Paul throws Charles out of his house.

Charles appears to abandon his plan to murder Paul and drives away with Hélène. In a roadside restaurant, a television announcer reports Paul's death from poisoning and appeals for Charles and Hélène to return, which they do. Charles argues with the police that it would be foolhardy for him to kill Paul when he knew the journal would reach them. However, the police put forward a theory that Charles has planned for the diary to be discovered and to use the argument to deflect their suspicions. Charles is arrested, but the police cannot find the poisoned bottle Paul was supposed to die from, since Charles left before Paul was poisoned. He is released soon after as Philippe confesses to the murder and provides the key evidence (the poisoned medication bottle) as a proof.

Back at their hotel, Charles is weary and promises to tell Hélène the entire story the next day. She wakes to find his note explaining that Philippe has confessed to the crime in order to save him and he (Charles) is the real murderer. He tells her to share his confession with the police and that he will punish himself and never be seen again. While the film shows him sailing oceanward, Charles recites in voice-over a line from the Vier ernste Gesänge by Johannes Brahms: "For that which befalls man befalls the beast, as the one dies, so dies the other".

== Cast ==
- Michel Duchaussoy as Charles Thénier
- Caroline Cellier as Hélène Lanson
- Jean Yanne as Paul Decourt
- Anouk Ferjac as Jeanne Decourt
- Marc Di Napoli as Philippe Decourt
- Louise Chevalier as Madame Levenes
- Dominique Zardi as Police Inspector
- Maurice Pialat as Police Commissioner

== Development ==
The Johannes Brahms song "Denn es gehet dem Menschen wie dem Vieh" from his Vier ernste Gesänge, eponymous for the film's title and used as a recurring motif, is sung by Kathleen Ferrier.

== Release ==
This Man Must Die opened in French cinemas on 5 September 1969, achieving a total of 1,092,910 admissions in the domestic market.

Paris-based Tamasa Distribution is set to release "Première Vague" a collection of blu-ray discs of seven early films by Chabrol. The box set is set for release in France on November 18, 2025. Variety reported that it would include films that were "long unavailable" to the public, including This Man Must Die.

== Reception ==
Writing for The New York Times upon the film's opening in New York, critic Roger Greenspun gave This Man Must Die a positive, though in parts restrained review. While calling it "surely one of the best new movies" which "adds wonderful moment to wonderful moment" and features "an idiomatic performance" by Jean Yanne, Greenspun also notes a shedding of "ironic strangeness" and a move towards the direct and sentimental in Chabrol's methods, and an ending whose images fall behind the director's usual technical capabilities. Roger Ebert gives the film 4 out of 4 stars, calling it "a macabre, bizarre study of the hazards of revenge, and it thrills us not with chases or cliff-hangers.... but with the relationship between good and evil people.... In the end, that's what makes Chabrol so fascinating. In being as concerned with the nuances of daily life as he is with the vast fact of murder, he makes the murder itself more horrible, and the revenge more ambiguous."
