= Nigel Strangeways =

Fictional private detective

- First appearance: A Question of Proof
- Last appearance: The Morning after Death
- Created by: Cecil Day-Lewis (writing as Nicholas Blake)
- Portrayed by: Ernesto Bianco; Nigel Stock; Glyn Houston; Bernard Horsfall; Richard Hurndall; Simon Cadell; Philip Franks; Billy Howle

In-universe information
- Gender: Male
- Occupation: Private detective
- Spouse: Georgia Cavendish (deceased)
- Nationality: British

Nigel Strangeways is a fictional British private detective created by Cecil Day-Lewis, writing under the pen name of Nicholas Blake. He was one of the prominent detectives of the Golden Age of Detective Fiction, appearing in sixteen novels between 1935 and 1966. He also features in a couple of short stories.

== Character overview ==
A gentleman detective, Strangeways is an Oxford-educated writer and nephew of Sir John Strangeways, Assistant Commissioner at Scotland Yard. His surname is derived from the Strangeways Prison in Manchester. In the first novel A Question of Proof he is modelled on the poet W. H. Auden but this aspect became less marked as the series progressed. As well as being a private investigator he also works as a literary scholar, producing a study of the Caroline poets amongst other works. Slightly arch, he is given to using literary quotations during his investigations, which often pass over the heads of the other characters. His style of detection has been compared to that of John Dickson Carr's Gideon Fell.

Many of the novels see Strangeways aiding Superintendent Blount of Scotland Yard in the police's official investigations. In the course of the second novel Thou Shell of Death, Strangeways meets Georgia Cavendish, an accomplished explorer, whom he soon marries.

During the course of the novels, Strangeways becomes involved in a number of cases reflecting the changing periods of the time. A variety of locations are used for the murder investigations he undertakes including a preparatory school (A Question of Proof, 1935), a brewery (There's Trouble Brewing, 1937), a holiday camp (Malice in Wonderland, 1940) a Whitehall ministry (Minute for Murder, 1947), a publishing house (End of Chapter, 1957) and a cruise ship (The Widow's Cruise, 1959). The Smiler with the Knife (1939) features a Fascist organisation plotting to overthrow British democracy, while The Sad Variety (1964) focuses on an attempt by British Communists and their Soviet backers to kidnap a professor.

== Novels ==
- A Question of Proof (1935)
- Thou Shell of Death (1936)
- There's Trouble Brewing (1937)
- The Beast Must Die (1938)
- The Smiler with the Knife (1939)
- Malice in Wonderland (1940)
- The Case of the Abominable Snowman (1941)
- Minute for Murder (1947)
- Head of a Traveller (1949)
- The Dreadful Hollow (1953)
- The Whisper in the Gloom (1954)
- End of Chapter (1957)
- The Widow's Cruise (1959)
- The Worm of Death (1961)
- The Sad Variety (1964)
- The Morning after Death (1966)

== Short stories ==
- "Mr Prendergast and the Orange" (1938), also published as "Conscience Money"
- "A Slice of Bad Luck" (1939), also published as "The Assassins' Club"
- "It Fell to Earth" (1944), also published as "Long Shot"

== Radio plays ==
- "Calling James Braithwaite" (1940), James McKechnie starred as Strangeways.

== Adaptations ==
=== Film ===
The fourth novel in the series The Beast Must Die has been adapted several times for film and television. The film versions include a 1952 Argentine adaptation, and the 1969 French film This Man Must Die.

=== Television ===
End of Chapter and The Beast Must Die were separately adapted for the 1960s BBC anthology series Detective. Strangeways was played by Glyn Houston and Bernard Horsfall, respectively.

In 2021, The Beast Must Die was yet again adapted as a television series for BritBox and AMC. Billy Howle starred as Strangeways, who was depicted as a police officer.

=== BBC Radio ===
In 1960, A Question of Proof was adapted for the Saturday Night Theatre, with Nigel Stock as Strangeways, whilst in 1966, Richard Hurndall starred in I Am Lucy Wragby, an adaptation of The Sad Variety. Simon Cadell played the detective in a 1991 adaptation of The Smiler with the Knife.

A Question of Proof and The Beast Must Die were adapted by Michael Bakewell in 2004. Both dramas starred Philip Franks as Strangeways.

== Bibliography ==
- Blackwell, Laird R. H.C. Bailey's Reggie Fortune and the Golden Age of Detective Fiction. McFarland, 2017.
- Goble, Alan. The Complete Index to Literary Sources in Film. Walter de Gruyter, 1999.
- James, Russell. Great British Fictional Detectives. Remember When, 21 Apr 2009.
- Stanford, Peter. C Day-Lewis: A Life. A&C Black, 2007.
