= Cecil Day-Lewis =

Irish-born British poet (1904–1972)

Cecil Day-Lewis CBE
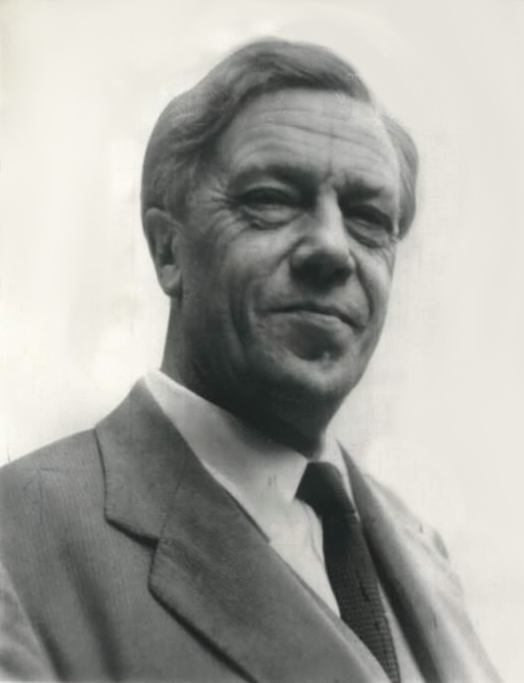
- Day-Lewis in 1968
- Born: 27 April 1904; Ballintubbert, County Laois, Ireland
- Died: 22 May 1972 (aged 68); Monken Hadley, London, England
- Resting place: St Michael's Church, Stinsford, Dorset, England
- Education: Wadham College, Oxford
- Occupations: Poet; novelist
- Spouses: Constance Mary King (m. 1928; div. 1951); Jill Balcon (m. 1951)
- Children: 4, including Tamasin and Daniel

Poet Laureate of the United Kingdom
- In office 2 January 1968 – 22 May 1972
- Monarch: Elizabeth II
- Preceded by: John Masefield
- Succeeded by: John Betjeman

Cecil Day-Lewis (or Day Lewis; 27 April 1904 – 22 May 1972), often written as C. Day-Lewis, was an Anglo-Irish poet and Poet Laureate of the United Kingdom from 1968 until his death. He also wrote mystery stories under the pseudonym Nicholas Blake, most of which feature the fictional detective Nigel Strangeways, starting with A Question of Proof (1935).

During the Second World War he worked as a publications editor in the British government's Ministry of Information and also served in the Musbury branch of the Home Guard. He was the father of the actor Sir Daniel Day-Lewis and the chef Tamasin Day-Lewis.

== Life and work ==
Cecil Day-Lewis was born in 1904 in Ballintubbert, Athy/Stradbally border, Queen's County (now known as County Laois), Ireland. He was the son of Frank Day-Lewis, a Church of Ireland rector of that parish, and Kathleen Blake (née Squires; died 1906). Some of his family were from England and the family had originally been from Berkhamsted, in Hertfordshire, and settled in Ireland in the late 1860s. His father took the surname "Day-Lewis" as a combination of his own birth father's ("Day") and adoptive father's ("Lewis") surnames. In his autobiography The Buried Day (1960), Day-Lewis wrote: "As a writer I do not use the hyphen in my surname – a piece of inverted snobbery which has produced rather mixed results."

IS IT FAR TO GO?

Is it far to go?
A step — no further.
Is it hard to go?
Ask the melting snow,
The eddying feather.

What can I take there?
Not a hank, not a hair.
What shall I leave behind?
Ask the hastening wind,
The fainting star.

Shall I be gone long?
For ever and a day.
To whom there belong?
Ask the stone to say,
Ask my song.

Who will say farewell?
The beating bell.
Will anyone miss me?
That I dare not tell —
Quick, Rose, and kiss me.

(c. 1940)

After the death of his mother in 1906, when he was two years old, Day-Lewis was brought up in London by his father, with the help of an aunt, spending summer holidays with relatives in County Wexford. He was educated at Sherborne School and then at Wadham College, Oxford, where he became part of the circle gathered around W. H. Auden and helped him to edit Oxford Poetry 1927. Day-Lewis's first collection of poems, Beechen Vigil and other Poems, appeared in 1925.

In 1928 Day-Lewis married Constance Mary King, the daughter of a Sherborne teacher. Day-Lewis worked as a schoolmaster in three schools, including Larchfield School in Helensburgh, Scotland (now Lomond School). During the 1940s he had a long and troubled love affair with the novelist Rosamond Lehmann, to whom he dedicated his 1943 poetry collection Word Over All. In 1948 Day-Lewis met the actress Jill Balcon, daughter of Michael Balcon, at the recording of a radio programme and began an affair with her that year. He conducted simultaneous relationships with his wife Constance Mary, who lived with their two sons in Dorset, with Lehmann, who lived in Oxfordshire, and with Balcon. Finally he broke with his wife and Lehmann, and after his marriage was dissolved in 1951, he married Balcon, but he was no more faithful to her than he had been to his wife or Lehmann. Jill's father was deeply unhappy about the scandalous affair since she was named publicly as co-respondent in Day-Lewis' divorce. He disinherited her and cut off all relationships with her and Day-Lewis.

During the Second World War, Day-Lewis worked as a publications editor in the Ministry of Information, an institution satirised by George Orwell in his dystopian Nineteen Eighty-Four, but equally based on Orwell's experience of the BBC. During the war his work was less influenced by Auden and he was developing a more traditional style of lyricism. Some critics believe that he reached his full stature as a poet in Word Over All (1943), when he finally distanced himself from Auden. After the war, he joined the publisher Chatto & Windus as a director and senior editor.

In 1946 Day-Lewis was a lecturer at Cambridge University, publishing his lectures in The Poetic Image (1947). He was made a Commander of the Most Excellent Order of the British Empire in the 1950 Birthday Honours. He later taught poetry at the University of Oxford, where he was Professor of Poetry from 1951 to 1956. During 1962–1963, he was the Norton Professor at Harvard University in the United States. He was appointed Poet Laureate of the United Kingdom in 1968, in succession to John Masefield. His appointment came after the appointments secretary John Hewitt consulted with Dame Helen Gardner, the Merton Professor of English at Oxford (who said Day-Lewis "produced run of the mill poetry but nothing particularly outstanding") and Geoffrey Handley-Taylor, chair of the Poetry Society (who stated that Day-Lewis was "a good administrative poet" and "a safe bet").

Day-Lewis was chairman of the Arts Council Literature Panel, vice-president of the Royal Society of Literature, an Honorary Member of the American Academy of Arts and Letters, a Member of the Irish Academy of Letters and a Professor of Rhetoric at Gresham College, London.

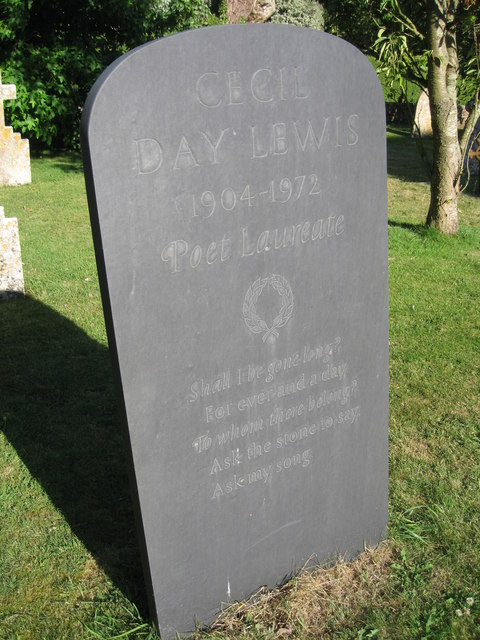
Headstone of Cecil Day-Lewis in the Stinsford churchyard

Day-Lewis died of pancreatic cancer on 22 May 1972, aged 68, at Lemmons, the Hertfordshire home of Kingsley Amis and Elizabeth Jane Howard, where he and his family were staying. As a great admirer of Thomas Hardy, he had arranged to be buried near Hardy's grave at St Michael's Church in Stinsford, Dorset.

Day-Lewis was the father of four children. His first two, with Constance Mary King, were Sean Day-Lewis (3 August 1931 – 9 June 2022), a television critic and writer, and Nicholas Day-Lewis (born 1934), an engineer. His children with Balcon were Tamasin Day-Lewis (born 1953), a television chef and food critic, and Sir Daniel Day-Lewis (born 1957), an award-winning actor. Sean wrote a biography of his father, C. Day-Lewis: An English Literary Life (1980). Daniel donated his father's archive of poetry to the Bodleian Library at the University of Oxford.

== Nicholas Blake ==
In 1935 Day-Lewis decided to increase his income from poetry by writing a detective novel, A Question of Proof, under the pseudonym Nicholas Blake. He created Nigel Strangeways, an amateur investigator and gentleman detective who, as the nephew of an Assistant Commissioner at Scotland Yard, has access to official crime investigations. He published nineteen further crime novels. (In the first Strangeways novel, the detective is modelled on W. H. Auden, but Day-Lewis developed the character as a far less extravagant and more serious figure in later novels.) From the mid-1930s Day-Lewis was able to earn his living by writing. Four of the Blake novels – A Tangled Web, A Penknife in My Heart, The Deadly Joker, The Private Wound – do not feature Strangeways.

Minute for Murder is set against the background of Day-Lewis's wartime experiences in the Ministry of Information. Head of a Traveller features as a principal character a well-known poet, frustrated and suffering writer's block, whose best poetic days are long behind him. Readers and critics have speculated whether the author is describing himself or one of his colleagues or has entirely invented the character.

== Political views ==
In his youth and during the disruption and suffering of the Great Depression, Day-Lewis adopted communist views, becoming a member of the Communist Party of Great Britain from 1935 to 1938. His early poetry was marked by didacticism and a preoccupation with social themes. In 1937 he edited The Mind in Chains: Socialism and the Cultural Revolution. In the introduction, he supported a popular front against a "Capitalism that has no further use for culture". He explains that the title refers to Prometheus bound by his chains, quotes Percy Bysshe Shelley's preface to Prometheus Unbound and says the contributors believe that "the Promethean fire of enlightenment, which should be given for the benefit of mankind at large, is being used at present to stoke up the furnaces of private profit". The contributors were: Rex Warner, Edward Upward, Arthur Calder-Marshall, Barbara Nixon, Anthony Blunt, Alan Bush, Charles Madge, Alistair Brown, J. D. Bernal, T. A. Jackson and Edgell Rickword.

After the late 1930s, which were marked by the purges, repression, and executions under Joseph Stalin in the Soviet Union, Day-Lewis gradually became disillusioned with communism. In his autobiography, The Buried Day (1960), he renounces his former communist views. His detective novel The Sad Variety (1964) contains a scathing portrayal of doctrinaire communists, the Soviet Union's repression of the 1956 Hungarian uprising, and the ruthless tactics of Soviet intelligence agents.

== Works ==
=== Poetry ===
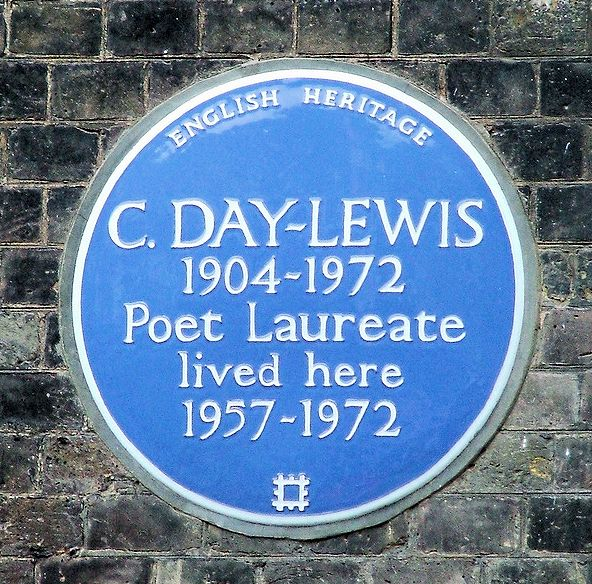
English Heritage blue plaque of Cecil Day-Lewis in Greenwich, London

- Transitional Poem (1929)
- From Feathers to Iron (1931)
- Collected Poems 1929–1933 (1935)
- A Time to Dance and Other Poems (1935)
- Overtures to Death (1938)
- Word Over All (1943)
- Short Is the Time (1945)
- Selected Poems (1951)
- Walking Away (1956)
- Collected Poems (1954)
- Pegasus and Other Poems (1957)
- The Gate, and Other Poems (1962)
- The Whispering Roots and Other Poems (1970)
- The Complete Poems of C. Day-Lewis (1992)
- Editor (with L. A. G. Strong): A New Anthology of Modern Verse 1920–1940 (1941)
- Editor (with John Lehmann): The Chatto Book of Modern Poetry 1915–1955 (1956)

=== Essay collections ===
- A Hope for Poetry (1934)
- Poetry for You (1944)
- The Poetic Image (1947)
- The Lyric Impule (1965)

=== Translations ===
- Virgil's Georgics (1940)
- Paul Valéry's Le Cimetière Marin (1946)
- Virgil's Aeneid (1952)
- Virgil's Eclogues (1963)

=== Novels written under his own name ===
==== Novels ====
- The Friendly Tree (1936)
- Starting Point (1937)
- Child of Misfortune (1939)

==== Novels for children ====
- Dick Willoughby (1933)
- The Otterbury Incident (1948)

==== Novels written as Nicholas Blake ====
===== Nigel Strangeways =====
- A Question of Proof (1935); First US edition by Harper and Brothers (1935)
- Thou Shell of Death (1936; First US edition by Harper and Brothers published as Shell of Death) (1936)
- There's Trouble Brewing (1937)
- The Beast Must Die (1938), adapted for the cinema by Román Viñoly Barreto in Argentina (1952) and by Claude Chabrol in France (1969), and in Britain in 2021 as The Beast Must Die television series
- The Smiler with the Knife (1939). Serialised News Chronicle, 1939
- Malice in Wonderland (1940; also published as Murder with Malice. U.S. title: The Summer Camp Mystery)
- The Case of the Abominable Snowman (1941; also published as The Corpse in the Snowman)
- Minute for Murder (1947)
- Head of a Traveller (1949)
- The Dreadful Hollow (1953)
- The Whisper in the Gloom (1954; also published as Catch and Kill)
- End of Chapter (1957)
- The Widow's Cruise (1959)
- The Worm of Death (1961)
- The Sad Variety (1964)
- The Morning after Death (1966)

===== Non-series novels =====
- A Tangled Web (1956; also published as Death and Daisy Bland)
- A Penknife in My Heart (1958)
- The Deadly Joker (1963)
- The Private Wound (1968)

=== Short stories ===
- "A Slice of Bad Luck" (The Bystander, 1 December 1935. Reprinted in Detection Medley, ed. John Rhode [Hutchinson, 1939]. Also published as "The Assassin's Club". Reprinted in Murder by the Book, ed. Martin Edwards, 2021)
- "Mr Prendergast and the Orange" (Sunday Dispatch, 27 March 1938. Reprinted in Bodies from the Library, Volume 3, ed. Tony Medawar [2020]. Also published as "Conscience Money".)
- "It Fell to Earth" (The Strand Magazine, June 1944. Also published as "Long Shot". Reprinted in Murder at the Manor, ed. Martin Edwards, 2016)
- "The Snow Line" (The Strand Magazine, February 1949. Also published as "A Study in White" and "A Problem in White". Reprinted in Silent Night, ed. Martin Edwards, 2015)
- "Sometimes the Blind See the Clearest" (Evening Standard, 18 March 1963. Also published as "Sometimes the Blind". Reprinted in The Long Arm of the Law, ed. Martin Edwards, 2017)

=== Radio plays ===
- Calling James Braithwaite. BBC Home Service, 20 and 22 July 1940. (Published in Bodies from the Library, Volume 1, edited by Tony Medawar [2018].)

=== Autobiography ===
- The Buried Day (1960)

=== Bibliography ===
- Sean Day-Lewis, Cecil Day-Lewis: An English Literary Life (1980)
- Peter Stanford, C. Day-Lewis: A Life (2007) review

== See also ==
- List of Gresham Professors of Rhetoric
