= Performance (British TV series) =

British television series

- Genre: Stage drama
- Country of origin: United Kingdom
- Original language: English (including translations)

Production
- Production company: BBC (some co-productions)

Original release
- Network: BBC2
- Release: 5 October 1991 – 21 March 1998

Related
- Theatre Night

Performance is a British television anthology series produced by Simon Curtis for the BBC. Twenty-six episodes aired on BBC2 between 5 October 1991 and 21 March 1998, almost all of which were productions of classic and contemporary plays, including Uncle Vanya by Anton Chekhov, A Doll's House and Hedda Gabler by Henrik Ibsen, Six Characters in Search of an Author by Luigi Pirandello, King Lear by William Shakespeare, and The Deep Blue Sea by Terence Rattigan.

Among its directors were Karel Reisz, Anthony Page, Richard Eyre, Simon Curtis, and Harold Pinter.

Its high-profile cast included Colin Firth, Kenneth Branagh, Elizabeth McGovern, Jeremy Irons, Judi Dench, Hugh Grant, Alec Guinness, Tom Wilkinson, Miranda Richardson, Ian Holm, Bill Nighy, John Gielgud, Geraldine Somerville and Juliet Stevenson.

== List of episodes ==
The main sources for compiling this list was the BFI Film and TV Database and the website of the BBC Genome Project.

Legend: Se = Season; Ep = Episode

Se	Ep	Title	Author	Producer/ Director	Performers	UK Transmission date
1	1	Absolute Hell	Rodney Ackland	Anthony Page (d), Simon Curtis (p)	Judi Dench, Bill Nighy, Ronald Pickup, Charles Gray, Anthony Calf	5 October 1991
1	2	Uncle Vanya	Anton Chekhov	Gregory Mosher (d), Simon Curtis (p)	David Warner, Ian Holm, Mary Elizabeth Mastrantonio, Ian Bannen, Roger Hammond	12 October 1991
1	3	Nona	Roberto Cossa (play), Michael Hastings (adaptation)	Simon Curtis (d/p)	Les Dawson, Liz Smith, Jim Broadbent, Timothy Spall, Jane Horrocks, Maurice Denham	19 October 1991
1	4	Old Times	Harold Pinter	Simon Curtis (d/p)	John Malkovich, Kate Nelligan, Miranda Richardson	26 October 1991
1	5	Top Girls	Caryl Churchill	Max Stafford-Clark (d), Simon Curtis (p)	Deborah Findlay, Beth Goddard, Lesley Manville	2 November 1991
1	6	The Trials of Oz	Geoffrey Robertson; John Mortimer	Sheree Folkson (d), Simon Curtis (p)	Hugh Grant, Peter O'Brien, Kevin Allen; Leslie Phillips, Nigel Hawthorne, Simon Callow, David Troughton, Alfred Molina, Nicholas Farrell, Nigel Planer, Lee Cornes	9 November 1991
2	1	Tales from Hollywood	Christopher Hampton	Howard Davies (d), Simon Curtis (p)	Jeremy Irons, Alec Guinness, Elizabeth McGovern, Sinéad Cusack; Ian Thompson, George Raistrick, Jack Shepherd, Lynn Farleigh, Mike McShane, Iain Rattray	19 October 1992 (U.S.); 14 November 1992 (UK)
2	2	A Doll's House	Henrik Ibsen	David Thacker, Simon Curtis	Juliet Stevenson, Trevor Eve, Geraldine James, Patrick Malahide, David Calder, Helen Blatch	21 November 1992
2	3	Roots	Arnold Wesker	Simon Curtis (d/p)	Jane Horrocks, Pam Ferris, Imelda Staunton, Christopher Eccleston, Timothy Spall	28 November 1992
2	4	After the Dance	Terence Rattigan	Stuart Burge (d), Simon Curtis (p)	Anton Rodgers, Gemma Jones, Imogen Stubbs, John Bird, Geoffrey Beevers	5 December 1992
2	5	Six Characters in Search of an Author	Luigi Pirandello	Bill Bryden (d), Simon Curtis (p)	Brian Cox, John Hurt, Tara Fitzgerald, Susan Fleetwood, Brian Glover, Steven Mackintosh	12 December 1992
3	1	The Maitlands	Robert MacKenzie	Lindsay Posner (d), Simon Curtis (p)	Eileen Atkins, Jennifer Ehle, Bill Nighy, Edward Fox, Samuel West	13 November 1993
3	2	Hedda Gabler	Henrik Ibsen	Deborah Warner (d), Simon Curtis (p)	Fiona Shaw, Nicholas Woodeson, Stephen Rea	27 November 1993
3	3	The Entertainer	John Osborne	Nicholas Renton (d), Simon Curtis (p)	Michael Gambon, Helen McCrory, Bill Owen, Billie Whitelaw	4 December 1993
3	4	The Changeling	Thomas Middleton and William Rowley; Michael Hastings (adaptation)	Simon Curtis (p)	Bob Hoskins, Elizabeth McGovern, Hugh Grant, Leslie Phillips, Sean Pertwee	11 December 1993
4	1	Message for Posterity	Dennis Potter	David Jones (d), Simon Curtis (p)	John Neville, Eric Porter, Ronald Pickup, Sophie Thompson, Abigail Cruttenden, Annette Crosbie, Tony Haygarth, Patrick Godfrey, Nicholas Selby, Stephen Moore	29 October 1994
4	2	Measure for Measure	William Shakespeare	David Thacker (d)	Tom Wilkinson, Corin Redgrave, Juliet Aubrey, Ian Bannen, David Bradley, Geoffrey Beevers, Rob Edwards, Sue Johnston	5 November 1994
4	3	The Deep Blue Sea	Terence Rattigan	Karel Reisz (d); Simon Curtis (p)	Penelope Wilton, Ian Holm, Colin Firth, Stephen Tompkinson, Geraldine Somerville, Edward Tudor-Pole	12 November 1994
4	4	The Mother	Paddy Chayefsky	Simon Curtis (d/p)	Anne Bancroft, Katherine Borowitz, Joan Cusack	19 November 1994
4	5	Summer Day's Dream	J. B. Priestley	Christopher Morahan (d), Simon Curtis (p)	John Gielgud, Terence Rigby, Rosemary Harris, Mike McShane; Vincent Wong	26 November 1994
5	1	Shadow of a Gunman	Sean O'Casey	Nye Heron	Kenneth Branagh, Stephen Rea, James Ellis	7 October 1995
5	2	The Widowing of Mrs. Holroyd	D. H. Lawrence	Katie Mitchell (d)	Zoë Wanamaker, Stephen Dillane, Colin Firth, Brenda Bruce	14 October 1995
5	3a	Landscape	Harold Pinter	Harold Pinter (d), Simon Curtis (p)	Ian Holm, Penelope Wilton	21 October 1995
5	3b	Bed	Jim Cartwright	Steve Shill (d), Kevin Loader	Renée Asherson, Robin Bailey, June Brown, Maurice Denham, Richard E. Grant, Lionel Jeffries	21 October 1995
5	4	Henry IV (Pt 1 & Pt 2)	William Shakespeare (plays), John Caird (adaptation)	John Caird (d), Annie Castledine (p)	Ronald Pickup, John Woodvine, Peter Jeffrey, Joseph O'Conor, David Calder, Geoffrey Hutchings, Jane Horrocks, Elizabeth Spriggs, Peter-Hugo Daly, Paul Eddington, Clive Kneller, Toby Jones	28 October 1995
5	5	After Miss Julie	Patrick Marber, August Strindberg	Patrick Marber (d), Fiona Finlay	Geraldine Somerville, Phil Daniels, Kathy Burke	4 November 1995
6	1	Company	Stephen Sondheim	Sam Mendes (d), Simon Curtis (ex p)	Adrian Lester, Sheila Gish, Sophie Thompson	1 March 1997
6	2	My Night with Reg	Kevin Elyot	Roger Michell (d), Kevin Loader (p)	David Bamber, John Sessions, Anthony Calf, Kenneth MacDonald	15 March 1997
6	3	Richard II	William Shakespeare	Deborah Warner (d), John Wyver (p)	Fiona Shaw (as Richard II), Graham Crowden, Richard Bremmer, Julian Rhind-Tutt, Donald Sinden	22 March 1997
6	4	Broken Glass	Arthur Miller	David Thacker (d), Fiona Finlay (p)	Henry Goodman, Margot Leicester, Mandy Patinkin, Elizabeth McGovern, Ed Bishop	29 March 1997
6	5	Macbeth on the Estate	William Shakespeare, Penny Woolcock (adaptation)	Penny Woolcock (d), Alison Gilby (p)	James Frain, Susan Vidler, Ray Winstone	5 April 1997
7	1	King Lear	William Shakespeare	Richard Eyre (d), Sue Birtwistle, Joy Spink (p)	Ian Holm; Timothy West, Amanda Redman, Michael Bryant	21 March 1998
