= A Doll's House (1992 film) =

- Written by: Henrik Ibsen; Joan Tindale
- Directed by: David Thacker
- Starring: Juliet Stevenson; Trevor Eve; Geraldine James; Patrick Malahide
- Theme music composer: Guy Woolfenden
- Country of origin: United Kingdom
- Original language: English

Production
- Producer: Simon Curtis
- Running time: 140 min.

Original release
- Network: BBC 2
- Release: 21 November 1992

A Doll's House is a 1992 videotaped television production of the 1879 play of the same name by Henrik Ibsen. It was directed by David Thacker and first broadcast on BBC 2 on 21 November 1992, and was later shown on PBS's Masterpiece in the United States.

== Plot ==
Torvald and Nora Helmer are married in Norway for eight years with three kids. Nora comes home from shopping for Christmas and the husband admonishes her for over spending. He expresses his love for his 'songbird' and gives her some extra money. Torvald is the man of the house and Nora only wants to please him. They have a sick friend Dr. Rank who visits daily.

An old friend of Nora comes for a visit. Kristine is now a widow and in need of a job. She hopes Nora will help her to get work at the bank where Torvald has just been promoted. Nora tells Kristine that no one takes her seriously but she has a secret. To save her sick husband's life, she borrowed money to afford a one-year trip to Italy for treatment. For years she has been paying back the money without her husband's knowledge.

Nils Krogstandt visits Nora and he too wants her to influence her husband this time to not fire him at the bank. Krogstandt lent Nora the money and she forged her dying father's signature on the IOU. He threatens to expose the loan to her husband and to bring criminal charges of forgery. Being blackmailed Nora feels hopeless but tries to get Krogstandt's job protected. She hints to her husband that Nils will spread false lies about them. Torvald tells his wife that Krogstandt has forgery in his past and he would look weak at the bank for not following up on his decision. He dismisses Krogstandt who in turn writes a tell-all letter that arrives in the Helmer's locked mailbox.

Nora does not think she is a bad person because she got the loan for love. She needs to stop her husband from seeing that letter. Kristine advises to just go tell Torvald everything. Nora thinks her strict and moral husband would never understand. She consults family friend Dr. Rank and thinks maybe he could lend her the payoff. Before telling the doctor her problem, Rank tells her he is soon to die and nobody remembers the dead. He also declares his love for her to her shock and dismay. Nora thinks about suicide as a solution but dismisses it. Kristine had a prior relationship with Krogstadt and she wants a chance to get the letter returned before it is opened.

Nora and Torvald go to a Christmas dance and afterward he expresses his love but Nora stops all of his advances to the point he is just going to open the mail. He reads the exposure letter and explodes. He calls his wife a hypocrite and a liar. How could his wife do this to him and what about his reputation at the bank. His reaction is all about himself. It turns out that Kristine's efforts are successful and a second letter arrives with a retraction and the incriminating IOU enclosed. Torvald is pleased the scandal will not be known. He forgives his wife of any wrong she may have done.

Nora has a revelation after her husband's "I'm saved" declaration about his honor. She insists they have a talk for the first time in eight years. She is going to leave him. He asks about love and her duty to him as her husband and to the children. She has a duty to herself. The reaction to the letters were only about him with no defense of his wife and her role. To his dismay the marriage is over. She tells him she no longer loves him and releases him of any duty due her and leaves.

== Cast ==
- Juliet Stevenson - Nora Helmer
- Trevor Eve - Torvald Helmer
- Geraldine James - Kristine Linde
- Patrick Malahide - Dr Rank
- David Calder - Nils Krogstad
- Sonia Ritter - Helene
- Helen Blatch - Anne-Marie
- Dennis Clinton - Porter
- Joe Anderson - Ivar
- Max Anderson - Bob
- Alexandra Gill - Emmy
