= Scott Rose-Marsh =

British actor (born 1988)

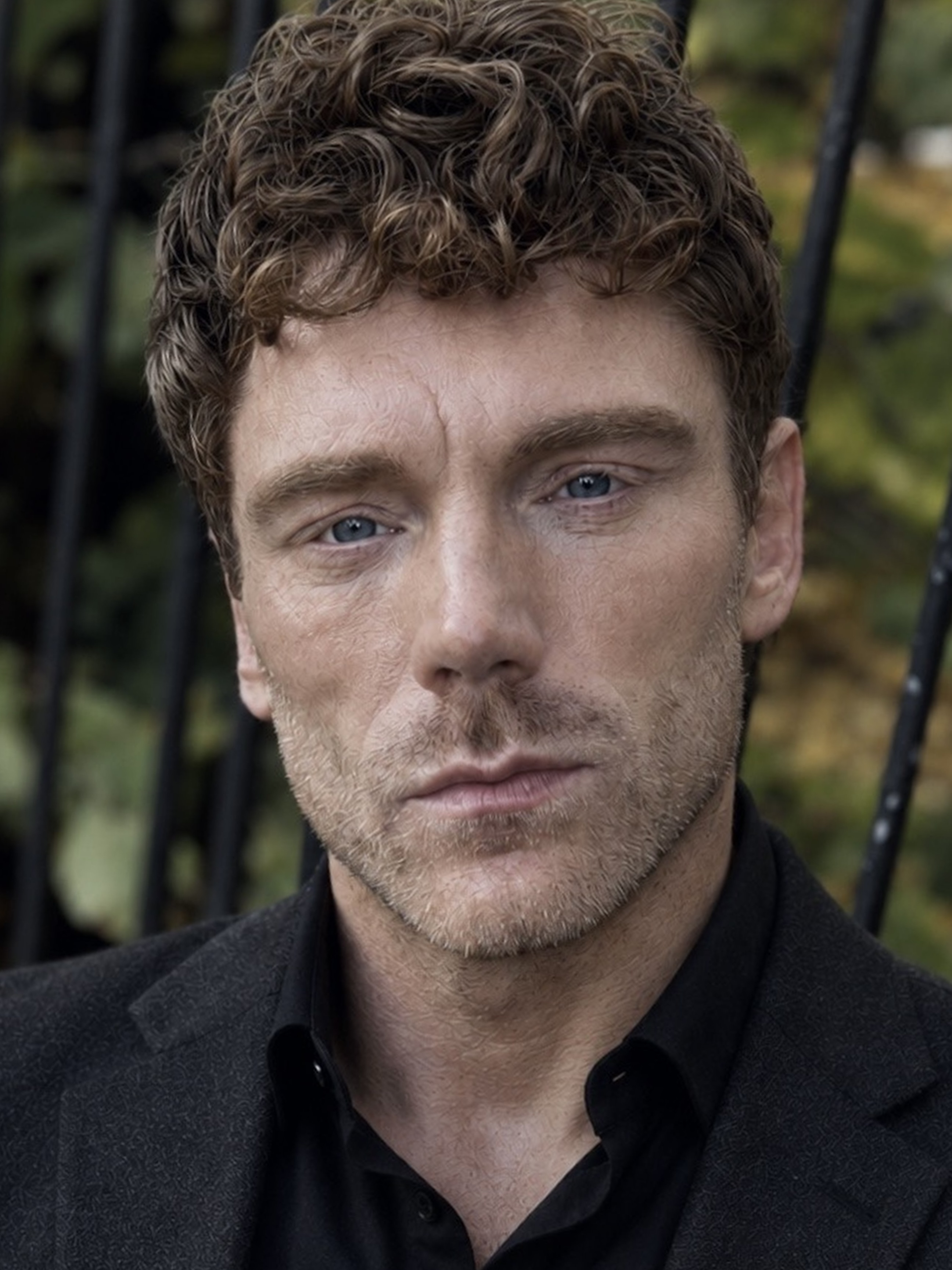
- Rose-Marsh in 2026
- Born: Scott Rose; Southampton, England
- Education: BRIT School
- Occupation: Actor
- Years active: 2020–present
- Known for: Yr Amgueddfa and Chloe

Scott Rose-Marsh is a British actor. He is known for his recurring role as Pete in the BAFTA Cymru Award-nominated S4C Welsh-language drama Yr Amgueddfa, as Jerome in the BBC One psychological thriller miniseries Chloe, and as George Cornell in the film Krays: Code of Silence (2021).

== Early life and education ==
Scott Rose-Marsh was born in Southampton, England, and grew up in the city. He attended Woodlands Community College before earning a place at the BRIT School for Performing Arts and Technology in London at age 16. In his late teens, he was seriously injured in a car accident, an experience he has said caused post-traumatic stress disorder and delayed his acting career by more than a decade.

In 2014, Rose-Marsh moved to Blaenau Gwent in South Wales, where he worked in a call centre.

== Career ==
=== Early roles and breakthrough (2020–2022) ===
Rose-Marsh began acting professionally in 2020 after leaving his call centre job during the COVID-19 pandemic. He has said that he submitted a recorded audition to a local agency and, within four months, was cast in his first television series. His first credited film role was in the low-budget feature Arthur & Merlin: Knights of Camelot (2020).

In 2021, Rose-Marsh was cast as Pete in Yr Amgueddfa (The Museum), a Welsh-language drama produced by Boom Cymru for S4C. He appeared in eight episodes across the show's two series, which ran from 2021 to 2023. The series received a BAFTA Cymru nomination in 2022.

Also, in 2021, Rose-Marsh played George Cornell in the crime film Krays: Code of Silence, directed by Ben Mole and starring Stephen Moyer. He also appeared in three episodes of the BBC One crime comedy The Outlaws, created by Stephen Merchant and Elgin James, in a recurring role as an Enforcer.

In 2022, Rose-Marsh played Jerome in Chloe, a six-part BBC One psychological thriller starring Erin Doherty and co-produced with Amazon for international release on Prime Video. He also portrayed as Becker in the World War II film Wolves of War (2022), directed by Giles Anderson and starring Ed Westwick and Rupert Graves.

=== James Bond casting (2025) ===
In July 2025, Rose-Marsh's name was rumoured to be included on lists of contenders to succeed Daniel Craig as James Bond in the next Eon franchise film, directed by Denis Villeneuve and written by Steven Knight for Amazon MGM Studios. On 13 August 2025, The Hollywood Reporter published a column citing a source close to the production who claimed Rose-Marsh had screen tested for Bond in June by reading scenes from GoldenEye (1995) and material attributed to Knight. The report noted that, if cast, he would be the first red-haired actor to play Bond and sparked widespread international media coverage. In October 2025, Rose-Marsh told the Australian magazine Man of Many that he could neither confirm nor deny the rumour and would support whoever was ultimately cast.

== Selected filmography ==
=== Film ===
Year	Title	Role
2020	Arthur & Merlin: Knights of Camelot	–
2021	You, Me & The Ex	David Hanson
2021	A Paper Trail of the Heart	Charlie
2021	This is Love	James
2021	Krays: Code of Silence	George Cornell
2022	Wolves of War	Becker

=== Television ===
Year	Title	Role
2021–2023	Yr Amgueddfa	Pete
2021	Chloe	Jerome
2021–22	The Outlaws	Enforcer
