= Yr Amgueddfa =

2021 Welsh drama television series

- Genre: Crime drama; Thriller
- Created by: Fflur Dafydd
- Written by: Fflur Dafydd
- Directed by: Rhys Powys; Rhys Carter
- Starring: Nia Roberts; Steffan Rhodri; Steffan Cennydd; Sharon Morgan; Delyth Wyn
- Country of origin: Wales
- Original language: Welsh
- No. of series: 2
- No. of episodes: 12

Production
- Executive producer: Paul Jones
- Producer: Paul Jones
- Editor: Dafydd Hunt
- Running time: 48 minutes
- Production companies: Boom Cymru; Tarian Cyf

Original release
- Network: S4C
- Release: 30 May 2021 – 29 January 2023

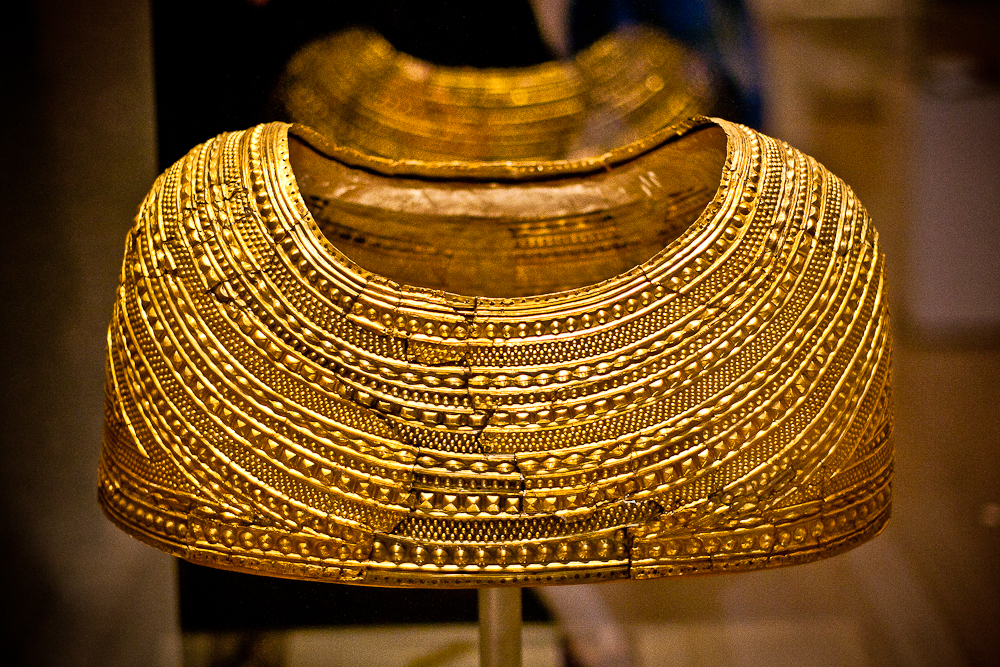
The series includes the Mold gold cape

Yr Amgueddfa (Welsh for 'the museum') is a Welsh-language crime drama television series created and written by Fflur Dafydd and produced by Boom Cymru for S4C. Set within and inspired by Amgueddfa Cymru – National Museum Wales, the series dramatises the self-destructive decline of Della Howells (Nia Roberts), a newly appointed museum director who begins an affair with a mysterious younger man and is drawn into the world of art crime.

The first series of six episodes was broadcast on S4C between 30 May and 4 July 2021, with all episodes also made available on BBC iPlayer with English subtitles. A second series, set largely in Carmarthen and Carmarthenshire, began on Boxing Day 2022 and concluded on 29 January 2023.

The series was nominated for a BAFTA Cymru for Television Drama in 2022 and received further nominations from the RTS Cymru and Celtic Media Festival Awards. It was subsequently sold internationally to BritBox in the United States and Canada, AXN Mystery in Japan and EITB in Spain.

== Plot ==
Della Howells (Nia Roberts), a respected art historian in her late forties, is appointed Director General of the National Museum of Wales. On the evening of the celebratory party at the museum, her son Daniel (Samuel Morgan-Davies) introduces her to his date Caleb (Steffan Cennydd), a charming younger man. Della and Caleb begin a passionate but secretive affair, and she is gradually drawn into the world of art crime as it becomes apparent that Caleb's interest in her is connected to a wider conspiracy involving stolen artworks, false provenance and a figure from Della's family past. Each of the six hour-long episodes in the first series is divided into three parts, with the final third devoted entirely to Caleb's perspective and his actions between scenes shown earlier in the episode.

In the second series, Della has taken a secondment to a small museum in rural Carmarthenshire, where she lives with Caleb in an old country house while he completes a degree in art history. When the museum becomes the destination for a temporary loan of the Mold Gold Cape from the British Museum, Della again finds herself confronting Fioled (Delyth Wyn) and the unresolved consequences of the events of the first series.

== Cast ==
=== Main ===
- Nia Roberts as Della Howells, the newly appointed Director General of the National Museum of Wales.
- Steffan Cennydd as Caleb, a mysterious younger man who begins a clandestine relationship with Della.
- Steffan Rhodri as Alun, Della's husband.
- Sharon Morgan as Elinor, Della's mother.
- Delyth Wyn as Fioled, the proprietor of a Cardiff charity shop with a connection to Della's father.

=== Recurring ===
- Samuel Morgan-Davies as Daniel, Della and Alun's son.
- Mared Jarman (series 1) and Bethan McLean (series 2) as Marged ("Mags"), Della and Alun's daughter.
- Hanna Jarman as Sadie.
- Mali Tudno Jones as Lisa.
- Simon Watts as Elfryn.
- Geraint Todd as Sulien.
- Oliver Williams as the young Caleb.
- Scott Rose-Marsh as Pete.
- Owain Gwynn as Mark.
- Ieuan Rhys as Gareth.
- Alun ap Brinley as Lloyd.
- Richard Elfyn as Byron.
- Lisa Victoria as Kay.

In the second series, additional recurring cast included Maria Pride as Eldeg, Sara Gregory as Annette, Ian Saynor as Heddwyn, Gwion Tegid as Glyn, Saran Morgan as Greta, Jâms Thomas as Mick, Mabli Gwynne as Teleri, Tim Goodings as Ralph and Amy Burnett as Catrina.

== Episodes ==
=== Series 1 (2021) ===
No.	Title	Directed by	Written by	Original air date
1	"Pennod 1"	Rhys Powys	Fflur Dafydd	30 May 2021
Della Howells, in her forties, is appointed Director General of the National Museum of Wales. At the celebratory party she is introduced to Caleb, the date of her son Daniel, and is drawn into a dangerous relationship.
2	"Pennod 2"	Rhys Powys	Fflur Dafydd	6 June 2021
As Della takes up her new role, her complicated relationship with Caleb intensifies. Caleb's motives in pursuing both Della and her son Daniel begin to come into focus.
3	"Pennod 3"	Rhys Powys	Fflur Dafydd	13 June 2021
During Della's morning visit to Caleb's home, her son Daniel arrives unannounced.
4	"Pennod 4"	Rhys Carter	Fflur Dafydd	20 June 2021
Della realises she has made a serious mistake with Caleb as a vase donated by him to the museum is found to have a doubtful provenance. It becomes apparent that Caleb is himself being manipulated by others.
5	"Pennod 5"	Rhys Carter	Fflur Dafydd	27 June 2021
Della's life deteriorates further, as a major secret about the authenticity of one of the museum's most valuable paintings is revealed.
6	"Pennod 6"	Rhys Carter	Fflur Dafydd	4 July 2021
With her life in ruins, Della leaves the family home, but not before making a dramatic discovery about her father's past and the criminal network around Fioled.

=== Series 2 (2022–2023) ===
No.	Title	Directed by	Written by	Original air date
1	"Pennod 1"	Rhys Carter	Fflur Dafydd	26 December 2022
Now on secondment to a small museum in Carmarthenshire, Della lives with Caleb and struggles with the chaos of her new workplace.
2	"Pennod 2"	Rhys Carter	Fflur Dafydd	1 January 2023
Strange events begin to disrupt Della's rural life: the water in the house turns black and patches appear and disappear on the walls.
3	"Pennod 3"	Rhys Carter	Fflur Dafydd	8 January 2023
Della succeeds in securing the Mold Gold Cape from the British Museum as a blockbuster loan, but is concerned about Fioled. The tension rises when she receives an unexpected visit at work.
4	"Pennod 4"	Rhys Carter	Fflur Dafydd	15 January 2023
Della and Glyn wait anxiously for the Mold Cape to arrive from London, but Fioled is just as eager to get her hands on it.
5	"Pennod 5"	Rhys Carter	Fflur Dafydd	22 January 2023
A long-missing Rembrandt resurfaces in Heddwyn's house, and Della begins to regret her move to Carmarthen.
6	"Pennod 6"	Rhys Carter	Fflur Dafydd	29 January 2023
It is Heddwyn's funeral – but can Della cope with the consequences of the events surrounding his death?

== Production ==
=== Development and casting ===
Yr Amgueddfa was created by Fflur Dafydd, who had previously adapted her novel Y Llyfrgell (The Library Suicides), set at the National Library of Wales in Aberystwyth, for the cinema. With Yr Amgueddfa, she said her intention was to "draw attention to Wales's institutions in a more creative way" and to develop "an art crime [genre] ... totally unique to Wales". The series was described by S4C as the channel's first foray into the "heritage thriller" or "art crime thriller", a label invented for the show.

The series was commissioned by S4C from Boom Cymru, part of ITV Studios, with Paul Jones, producer of Parch, 35 Awr and Martha, Jac a Sianco, as executive producer. Co-production credits at BAFTA Cymru also list Tarian Cyf alongside Boom Cymru and S4C. Nia Roberts, whose previous credits include Y Gwyll, Bang, Hidden (Craith) and The Crown, was cast as Della.

Steffan Cennydd, a Carmarthen-born actor previously nominated for a BAFTA Cymru Breakthrough Award for Enid a Lucy and known for The Pembrokeshire Murders and The Feast (Gwledd), was cast as Caleb in his first leading television role. Steffan Rhodri, Sharon Morgan and Delyth Wyn joined the cast as Della's husband Alun, her mother Elinor, and the antagonist Fioled, respectively, alongside newcomers Samuel Morgan-Davies and Mared Jarman as her children.

=== Filming ===
Principal photography for the first series began at National Museum Cardiff in January 2021, while the museum was closed to the public because of the COVID-19 pandemic. Neil Wicks, deputy director general of Amgueddfa Cymru – Museum Wales, said the production helped to offset the museum's loss of commercial income during the lockdowns and put a spotlight on the building's collections. Boom Cymru followed guidelines issued by the Welsh Government to ensure that filming was carried out safely. Additional Cardiff-area locations for the first series included Penarth, with Stanwell Road and the doorway of Rowley's Jewellers used as a backdrop.

Filming on the second series began in February 2022, with creator Fflur Dafydd posting an image of the first scene's clipboard on her Twitter account on 28 February. The action moved out of the capital to West Wales, with Carmarthenshire County Museum at Abergwili serving as the small rural museum where Della takes up a secondment. A former bishop's dining room at the museum was used as a gallery space, and the production formed part of the building's first major use as a filming location following an extensive renovation. Other locations in the second series included the National Botanic Garden of Wales in Llanarthne and scenes around Llyn y Fan Fach, drawing on the local legend of the Lady of the Lake.

Rhys Powys directed the first three episodes of series 1, with Rhys Carter directing the remaining three episodes as well as the entirety of series 2. Series 2 was edited by Dafydd Hunt, whose work was subsequently nominated at the 2023 BAFTA Cymru Awards.

== Reception ==
Yr Amgueddfa was generally well received by Welsh and UK critics, who praised its distinctive premise, lead performances and use of the National Museum Cardiff as a setting. Writing in the Wales Arts Review, Gareth Smith called the series "not just a collection of clichés", praising Nia Roberts' performance as "complex and realistic" and Steffan Cennydd's portrayal of Caleb as pitched "exactly right, neither too charming nor creepy". Smith also highlighted the series' cinematic use of the museum's architecture, which he wrote made "excellent use of the building's architecture, capturing its splendor". Drama Quarterly described the series as a six-part thriller that "blends art heist thriller with illicit romance".

== Awards and nominations ==
Year	Award	Category	Nominee	Result	Ref.
2022	BAFTA Cymru	Television Drama	Yr Amgueddfa – Boom Cymru / Tarian Cyf / S4C	Nominated	
2022	RTS Cymru Awards	Drama	Yr Amgueddfa	Nominated	
2022	Celtic Media Festival Awards	Drama	Yr Amgueddfa	Nominated	
2023	BAFTA Cymru	Editing: Fiction	Dafydd Hunt	Nominated	

== See also ==
- List of Welsh television series
