= The Twin Dilemma =

136 – The Twin Dilemma
- Doctor Who serial
- The region 2 DVD cover

Cast
- Doctor: Colin Baker – Sixth Doctor
- Companion: Nicola Bryant – Peri Brown
- Others: Maurice Denham – Edgeworth; Edwin Richfield – Mestor; Kevin McNally – Hugo Lang; Dennis Chinnery – Sylvest; Paul Conrad (Note: Credited as Gavin Conrad) – Romulus; Andrew Conrad – Remus; Seymour Green – Chamberlain; Oliver Smith – Drak; Barry Stanton – Noma; Dione Inman – Elena; Helen Blatch – Fabian; Roger Nott – Prisoner; John Wilson – Jacondan Guard; Les Conrad – Jacondan Guard (uncredited)

Production
- Directed by: Peter Moffatt
- Written by: Anthony Steven
- Script editor: Eric Saward
- Produced by: John Nathan-Turner
- Music by: Malcolm Clarke
- Production code: 6S
- Series: Season 21
- Running time: 4 episodes, 25 minutes each
- First broadcast: March 22, 1984
- Last broadcast: March 30, 1984

Chronology
← Preceded by The Caves of Androzani	Followed by → Attack of the Cybermen

The Twin Dilemma is the seventh and final serial of the 21st season of the British science fiction television series Doctor Who, which was first broadcast in four twice-weekly parts from 22 to 30 March 1984. It was directed by Peter Moffatt and written by Anthony Stevens. The serial stars Colin Baker and Nicola Bryant as the Sixth Doctor and Peri Brown, respectively. The Twin Dilemma was the first to star Baker.

The serial follows the Doctor immediately after regenerating as he works to prevent the alien gastropod Mestor (Edwin Richfield) from plotting to explode the sun of the planet Jaconda to scatter his eggs throughout the universe to conquer it.

The Twin Dilemma was critically panned with both the writing and direction being heavily criticized, though Baker's performance did receive some praise. It received a novelisation written by Eric Saward which was later adapted into an audiobook. The serial averaged 7.1 million viewers per episode, down slightly from the previous story.

== Plot ==
As a result of his recent regeneration, the Sixth Doctor suffers from mood swings and violent delusions, culminating in his attempt to strangle his companion, Peri Brown. Realising the threat he could pose to the universe in this state, the Doctor decides to exile himself and Peri to a remote asteroid Titan 3. Meanwhile, the mysterious Professor Edgeworth abducts two teenaged mathematical geniuses, Romulus and Remus Sylvest, at the behest of Mestor, the leader of the slug-like Gastropods who have usurped Edgeworth as ruler of the planet Jaconda. Mestor orders Edgeworth to hide on Titan 3, and destroys a pursuing squad of fighters.

The only survivor of the fighter squadron is Lieutenant Hugo Lang, who crash-lands near the TARDIS. The Doctor saves Hugo at Peri's behest, and he and Peri investigate the asteroid, leading to them being captured by Edgeworth. The Doctor recognises that "Edgeworth" is actually Azmael, a fellow Time Lord and his former tutor. Azmael tries to strand the Doctor and Peri on Titan 3, but unbeknownst to Azmael, his assistant Noma arms a bomb intended to kill them both, and they narrowly escape with their lives.

The Doctor, Peri, and Hugo follow Azmael to the now-desolate Jaconda, where Azmael makes it clear he never intended for them to be harmed, and reveals that Mestor is forcing him to have Romulus and Remus create calculations which will xenoform two nearby planets that the Gastropods can settle on. The Doctor, however, realizes that Mestor has lied to Azmael about the nature of his plan, and the calculations will actually cause Jaconda's sun to go supernova, allowing Gastropod eggs to infest the galaxy.

After the Doctor tries and fails to kill him, Mestor announces that he will take over the Doctor's body. The Doctor tries to goad Mestor into doing this, but he instead takes over Azmael. The more experienced Azmael manages to briefly retake control of his body and initiates a regeneration, but since he has used up his entire regeneration cycle, this has the effect of killing both himself and Mestor, though Azmael and the Doctor make amends before the former dies. Hugo decides to stay on Jaconda and become its new ruler, while the Doctor agrees to return Romulus and Remus to their parents.

== Production ==
=== Development and filming ===
The reason for producer John Nathan-Turner's decision to place The Twin Dilemma at the end of Doctor Who season 21 was out of a desire to introduce the new Doctor as fast as possible. The serial was developed under the working title A Stitch in Time. Nathan-Turner wanted the serial to be "simplistic", while script editor Eric Saward wanted it to be elaborate and complicated.

The serial was directed by Peter Moffatt. Moffatt later stated that The Twin Dilemma was one of his worst serials and that he did a terrible job. Moffatt shot as much of the serial as possible in chronological order. The first block of filming began on 24 January 1984, and ran for three days. The second block started on 7 February and ran for two days. The third and final block began on 14 February and ran for 3 days. The entirety of the first and third blocks were shot in studios 8 and 3 of the BBC Television Centre respectively. The scenes for Titan 3 were shot at Springwell Quarry in Hertfordshire and the scenes for Jaconda were shot at Gerrards Cross, Buckinghamshire.

The Twin Dilemma retained Sid Sutton's starfield title sequence, which was first introduced for The Leisure Hive in 1980. The animated stars gathered into a constellation form, which morphed into a head shot of Colin Baker as the Doctor, replacing the earlier image of Peter Davison. The title sequence was superimposed with additional visual effects to realise Sutton's brief to make the titles "brash and colourful". The sequence also retained Sutton's neon tubing-style logo and Peter Howell's synthesizer arrangement of Ron Grainer's theme music.

=== Writing ===
The Twin Dilemma was written by Anthony Steven. Nathan-Turner had previously worked with Steven on the drama series All Creatures Great and Small. Steven struggled to meet deadlines for the serial leading to several delays. Shortly after completing the script Steven became sick and unable to perform rewrites, leading Saward to completely rewrite the second half of the serial. Saward cut several major story beats including a speech the Doctor would give to Azmael and the Doctor promising to return to Jaconda.

Throughout the serial The Doctor is unusually violent, even attempting to strangle Peri. The intention was to create a Doctor that was initially unlikeable, but would grow to become beloved by the audience. This was intended to be in contrast with the more likable Fifth Doctor. During the 2003 documentary The Story of Doctor Who Baker revealed that the original plan was "over the many, many years I would be playing the part, the outer layers would gradually peel away, revealing the kind-hearted soul."

=== Casting ===
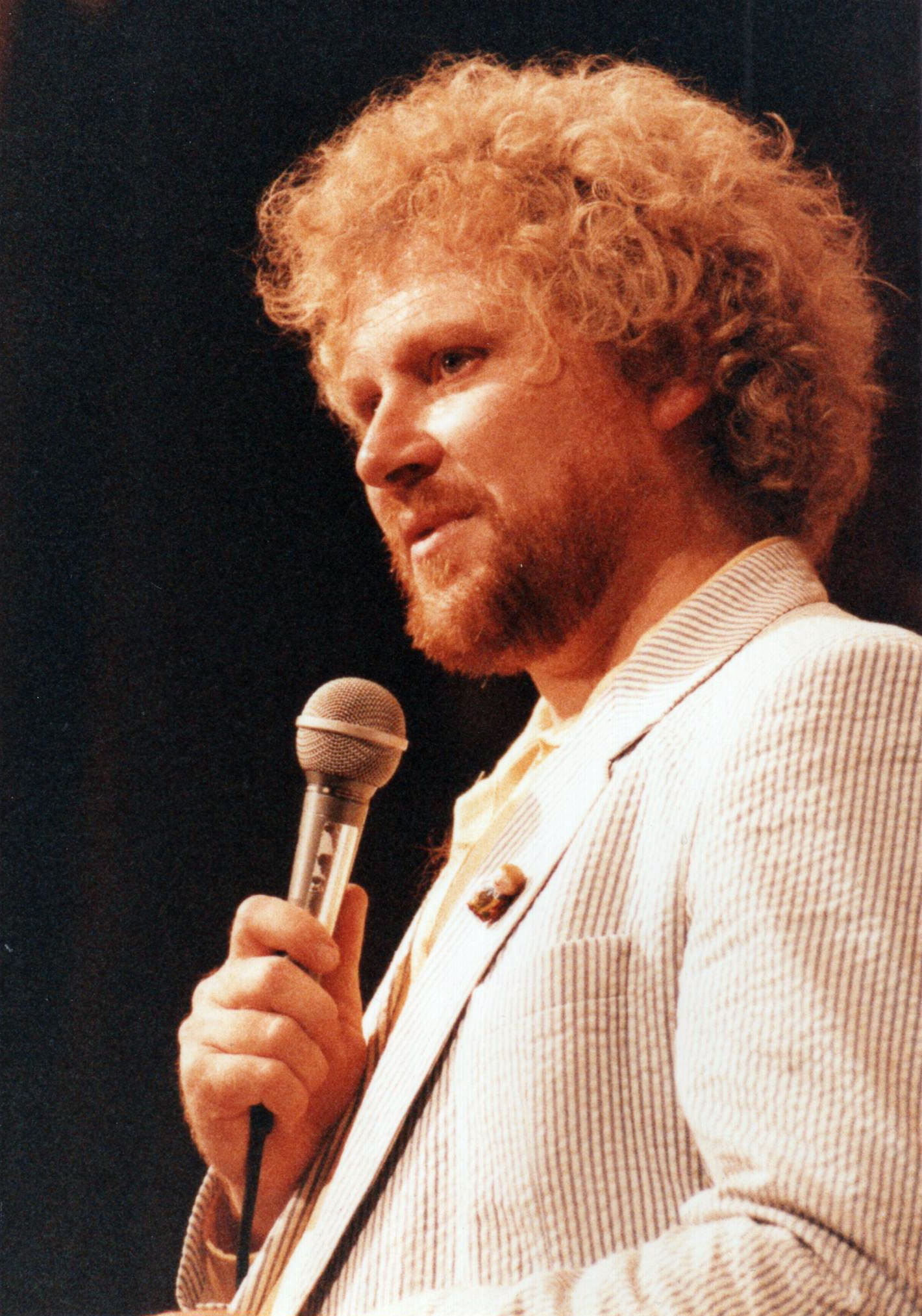
Actor Colin Baker makes his debut in this serial in the lead role as the Doctor.

Nicola Bryant returns from the previous serial as Peri Brown. Colin Baker makes his first full appearance as the Sixth Doctor. Prior to being cast, various media outlets had suggested Baker should be the one to replace Peter Davison as the next Doctor. Baker, a fan of Doctor Who, had expressed interest and previously considered auditioning for the role of the Fourth Doctor. However, due to Baker's casting as Commander Maxil in Arc of Infinity he assumed he would be ineligible for the role. On 10 June 1983, during a meeting with the production team, Baker was formally offered the role by Nathan-Turner. He accepted and signed a four year contract.

Edwin Richfield portrayed Mestor, the serial's primary antagonist. Richfield had previously appeared as Captain Hart in the 1972 serial The Sea Devils. Kevin McNally was cast as Lieutenant Hugo Lang. McNally had been a fan of Doctor Who as a child.

When casting the titular twins Moffatt had intended to cast a pair of girls, but Nathan-Turner insisted that the twins should be male. Moffatt instead selected Andrew and Paul Conrad, children of Les Conrad who had served as an extra in several past serials. Les appeared in The Twin Dilemma as a Jacondan guard.

=== Costuming ===
For the first half of "Part One" both Baker and Bryant wore the same costumes the Doctor and Peri wore in The Caves of Androzani before changing into new outfits. Baker suggested that the Sixth Doctor's outfit should be a black suit. Nathan-Turner rejected it as he wanted the Doctor to wear something "totally tasteless". Peri's new outfit was originally a blue trouser suit, however Nathan-Turner opposed this as he felt she should wear something more revealing.

The cat badge worn by the Sixth Doctor on his lapel for this story was handmade and painted by Suzie Trevor and purchased for the programme from a specialist badge shop in Central London. Baker suggested that in each subsequent story, the Doctor should wear a different cat badge to symbolise his mood.

== Release ==
=== Ratings ===
Episode	Title	Run time	Original release date	UK viewers (millions)	Appreciation Index
1	"Part One"	24:42	March 22, 1984	7.6	61
2	"Part Two"	25:09	March 23, 1984	7.4	66
3	"Part Three"	24:27	March 29, 1984	7.0	59
4	"Part Four"	25:04	March 30, 1984	6.3	67

The Twin Dilemma was released on BBC1 in four twice-weekly parts from 22 to 30 March 1984. "Part One" was released to an audience of 7.6 million viewers, making it the highest viewed episode. It was followed by the second highest viewed, "Part Two", with only 7.4 million. Parts three and four were viewed by 7.0 and 6.3 million viewers, respectively. Audience Appreciation Index were taken for the episodes, the best rated episode was "Part Four" with a 67 and the lowest was "Part Three" with a 59. The serial averaged 7.1 million viewers per episode. The Twin Dilemma averaged 180 thousand less viewers than the previous serial.

=== Reception ===
The Twin Dilemma was panned by both critics and fans. Where the previous serial, The Caves of Androzani, is frequently cast among the very best of all Doctor Who stories, The Twin Dilemma is often regarded as one of the very worst. Despite the overwhelmingly negative reception for the serial, Baker's performance was somewhat praised. Writing for Den of Geek, Andrew Blair felt that the quality of the serial partially devalued the ending of The Caves of Androzani. David J. Howe and Stephen James Walker review of the story in Doctor Who: The Television Companion describes The Twin Dilemma as "painful to watch", feeling that the Doctor's erratic behaviour was "forced and artificial, and succeed[s] only in alienating the viewer." The review also argues the script "leaves much to be desired" and that the direction is uninteresting, giving the whole story "a rather tacky, B-movie feel to it".

In the 150th issue of SFX magazine Russell T Davies, producer of the 2005 revival, cites the story as "the beginning of the end" of Doctor Who. Tat Wood and Lawrence Miles, reviewing the story for their book, About Time, noted that the divide in quality between The Caves of Androzani and The Twin Dilemma "felt wrong at the time, and still feels wrong now". The pair wrote, "How could anyone have thought that this story, of juvenile space monsters, meaningless plans and never-ending cop-outs, was ever workable?". Writing for Radio Times, Patrick Mulkern heavily criticized the serial along with the new Doctor. Mulkern disliked the episode's villains, finding them dull and boring, and stated that the main problems were the writing and the direction. He did, however, praise Baker's performance. Digital Spy's Morgan Jeffery also criticized the direction calling it "unusually flat" for Moffatt.

A 1998 poll by Doctor Who Magazine ranked the serial the second worst of all time only ahead of the Children in Need special Dimensions in Time. In 2009, another Doctor Who Magazine poll of the 200 stories produced up to that point saw the serial finish in last place, along with finishing last in every single age group that voted.

== Commercial releases ==
=== In print ===
The Twin Dilemma
- Author: Eric Saward
- Cover artist: Andrew Skilleter
- Series: Doctor Who book: Target novelisations
- Release number: 103
- Publisher: Target Books
- Publication date: September 1985 (hardback) March 1986 (paperback)
- ISBN: 0-491-03124-6

A novelisation of this serial, written by Saward, was published in hardback by Target Books in September 1985, and in paperback in March 1986. The cover illustration originally featured Colin Baker; however, when Baker's agent enquired about a royalty, the decision was taken to not feature him on the cover and a replacement was commissioned.

In January 2012, an audiobook version of the novelisation was released, with narration by Baker.

=== Home media ===
The Twin Dilemma was released on VHS in May 1992. The tape was available exclusively through Woolworths as part of a special promotion. A general release followed in February 1993.

Behind the scenes footage of the serial was released along with various other Sixth Doctor stories the most prominent being the 2008 release of The Trial of a Time Lord.

The serial was released on DVD on 7 September 2009. Despite being the first Sixth Doctor story it was the last to be released on DVD. It was later re-released as part of the Doctor Who DVD Files in Issue 127 on 13 November 2013.

== Bibliography ==
- Lofficier, Jean-Marc (1994). The Doctor Who Programme Guide (Third ed.). Target Books. ISBN 0-426-20342-9.
- Howe, David J.; Walker, Stephen James (1998). Doctor Who: The Television Companion. BBC Books.
- Pixley, Andrew (October 1998). "The DWM Archive - The Twin Dilemma". Doctor Who Magazine. No. 270. Panini Comics.
- Miles, Lawrence; Wood, Tat (2005). About Time 5: 1980–1984: Seasons 18 to 21. Mad Norwegian Press. ISBN 0975944649.
- Golder, Dave (29 November 2006). "Hanging out with David, Billie and the Cybermen". SFX. No. 150. Future plc.
- Darlington, David (September 2009). "DVD Preview - The Twin Dilemma". Doctor Who Magazine. No. 412. Panini Comics.
- Griffiths, Peter (October 2009). "The Mighty 200!". Doctor Who Magazine. No. 413. Panini Comics.
- Bishop, Venessa (2012). "The Twin Dilemma". Doctor Who Magazine. No. 443. Panini Comics.
- Ainsworth, John (2015). "Doctor Who - The Complete History: The Twin Dilemma, Attack of the Cybermen, and Vengeance on Varos". Doctor Who - The Complete History. Vol. 40. Panini Comics.
- Wright, Marc (2018). "Doctor Who - The Complete History: Resurrection of the Daleks, Planet of Fire, and The Caves of Androzani". Doctor Who - The Complete History. Vol. 39. Panini Comics.
