= Chloe (TV series) =

2022 British television miniseries

- Written by: Alice Seabright; Kayleigh Llewellyn; Poppy Cogan
- Directed by: Alice Seabright; Amanda Boyle
- Starring: Erin Doherty; Billy Howle; Pippa Bennett-Warner; Jack Farthing; Brandon Micheal Hall; Poppy Gilbert
- Composer: Will Gregory
- Country of origin: United Kingdom
- Original language: English
- No. of series: 1
- No. of episodes: 6

Production
- Executive producers: Tally Garner; Ben Irving; Morven Reid
- Producer: Joanna Crow
- Production location: United Kingdom
- Cinematography: Catherine Goldschmidt
- Editors: Brenna Rangott; Fin Oates
- Production companies: Mam Tor Productions; Amazon Studios

Original release
- Network: BBC One
- Release: 6 February – 21 February 2022

Chloe is a 2022 British psychological thriller television miniseries created by Alice Seabright for BBC One and Amazon Studios that premiered in the United Kingdom on BBC One on 6 February 2022, and released worldwide on 24 June on Amazon Prime Video. It received critical acclaim, with praise going towards Erin Doherty's performance.

== Plot ==
A lonely twentysomething, Becky Green, becomes obsessed with the suicide of her estranged childhood friend Chloe and assumes a new identity as Sasha to engineer a "chance" meeting with Chloe's best friend, Livia, at an art event, followed by another run-in at a yoga class.

Sasha then infiltrates Chloe's group of close-knit friends. She also gains a job outside her genuine work experience through Livia's contacts as she attempts to discover why Chloe died. Through her new alter-ego, she leads a life that is far more exciting than her life as Becky.

A series of flashbacks reveals that Becky had two missed calls from Chloe minutes before her death. As Sasha, Becky eventually uncovers the truth of Chloe’s clandestine activities she has hidden from her husband and friends.

Becky starts an affair with Chloe's widowed husband, Elliot; the rest of the group, including Elliot's mother, disapprove of their relationship. Elliot decides to run for election. Becky and Livia run his campaign along with Elliot's friend Nish.

Becky carries on the investigation, questioning all the group one by one to find out if Chloe was trying to escape from controlling Elliot, who was forcing her to take medication and maintaining complete control over her finances. However, on the night of the planned escape, Richard, who was supposed to help her, does not appear. Chloe goes to her parents' house and her mother informs Elliot of her whereabouts. Elliot comes to pick her up, Chloe runs from him and dies. Becky, upon hearing the account from Chloe's mother, suspects that Eliot may have pushed her.

Livia exposes Becky and the group abandons her. She meets Elliot one last time to record his angry and vicious outburst and posts it on Instagram from Chloe's account.

Livia and Becky meet one last time. Becky plays a message from Eliot to Chloe, in which he lies about something Livia said. Livia says that Elliot told her that Chloe had criticised her parenting. Becky gives Livia her new phone number and she leaves.

== Cast ==
- Erin Doherty as Becky Green
- Billy Howle as Elliot Fairbourne
- Pippa Bennett-Warner as Livia Fulton
- Jack Farthing as Richard Greenbank
- Poppy Gilbert as Chloe Fairbourne
  - Gia Hunter as teenage Chloe
- Akshay Khanna as Anish
- Brandon Micheal Hall as Josh Stanfield
- Lisa Palfrey as Pam Green
- Scott Rose-Marsh as Jerome
- Alexander Eliot as Phil Fulton

== Episodes ==
| No. | Title | Directed by | Written by | Original release date | U.K viewers (millions) |
|---|---|---|---|---|---|
| 1 | "Episode 1" | Alice Seabright | Alice Seabright | 6 February 2022 | 5.87 |
| 2 | "Episode 2" | Alice Seabright | Alice Seabright | 7 February 2022 | 4.15 |
| 3 | "Episode 3" | Alice Seabright | Kayleigh Llewellyn | 13 February 2022 | N/A |
| 4 | "Episode 4" | Amanda Boyle | Poppy Cogan | 14 February 2022 | N/A |
| 5 | "Episode 5" | Amanda Boyle | Alice Seabright | 20 February 2022 | N/A |
| 6 | "Episode 6" | Amanda Boyle | Alice Seabright | 21 February 2022 | N/A |

== Production ==
=== Development ===
Series creator Seabright co-wrote the series with Kayleigh Llewellyn, Poppy Cogan, Bolu Babalola and Sam Baron. It is produced by Joanna Crow and executive produced by Tally Garner and Morven Reid at Mam Tor Productions, and Ben Irving at the BBC. The series was first announced by the BBC in February 2020. On 20 April 2021 Amazon Studios announced that it would co-produce the series.

=== Cast ===
The cast was announced in April 2021, with Erin Doherty, Billy Howle, Pippa Bennett-Warner, and Jack Farthing set to star. Seabright has said they had Doherty in mind for the lead role at a very early stage.

=== Filming ===
Principal photography took place on location in Burnham-on-Sea, Brean Down and Bristol at The Bottle Yard Studios. The work of local artists is featured in Chloe.

=== Music ===
The score is composed by Will Gregory of the music duo Goldfrapp, featuring his musical partner Alison Goldfrapp, and Adrian Utley of Bristol band Portishead.

== Broadcast ==
The BBC released a trailer for the series in January 2022, announcing its 6 February 2022 BBC One and BBC iPlayer airdate. The series was released on Amazon Prime internationally.

== Reception ==
On the review aggregation website Rotten Tomatoes, the series holds an approval rating of 94% with an average rating of 7.8 out of 10, based on 32 reviews. The website's critical consensus said, "Chloe can sometimes strain credulity, but Erin Doherty's excellent performance brings a human touch to this technological thriller." On Metacritic, which uses a weighted average, the series received a score of 86 out of 100, based on 13 critic reviews.

Lucy Mangan of The Guardian wrote, "There is not one false note in this fierce, fresh murder mystery... It's an absolute feast of a show", adding, "It is a fierce, fresh sort-of-murder-mystery that is as keenly scripted as it is paced, and whose many threads are held firmly together by an outstanding performance from Erin Doherty." Sabrina Barr of Metro wrote that the series "highlights the unhealthy obsession that many of us can have both on social media and on comparing our lives to others".

== Accolades ==
Chloe was nominated in the Limited-Series category at the Royal Television Society Programme Awards in March 2023.
