= Paris Paramount =

- Directed by: Nancy Meyers
- Written by: Nancy Meyers
- Produced by: Nancy Meyers; Ilona Herzberg
- Starring: Penélope Cruz; Kieran Culkin; Jude Law; Owen Wilson; Erin Doherty; Tony Hale; Beverly D'Angelo
- Cinematography: Michael Bauman
- Production company: Southfield Entertainment
- Distributed by: Warner Bros. Pictures
- Release date: December 25, 2027
- Country: United States
- Language: English
- Budget: $120 million

Paris Paramount is an upcoming American romantic comedy film written, produced, and directed by Nancy Meyers. It stars Penélope Cruz, Kieran Culkin, Jude Law, Owen Wilson, Erin Doherty, Tony Hale, and Beverly D'Angelo. The film focuses on a filmmaker and a producer who were once romantic and creative partners. Years after their breakup, they must reunite for a new movie together.

Paris Paramount is scheduled to be released in the United States by Warner Bros. Pictures on December 25, 2027.

== Cast ==
- Penélope Cruz
- Kieran Culkin
- Jude Law
- Owen Wilson
- Erin Doherty
- Tony Hale
- Beverly D'Angelo
- Apple Martin

== Production ==
In 2019, Nancy Meyers said she was taking a break from filmmaking. On April 5, 2022, Netflix announced she would write, direct, and produce an untitled comedy film for the streamer, marking her return to directing after The Intern (2015). In March 2023, Penélope Cruz, Scarlett Johansson, Owen Wilson and Michael Fassbender were circling roles in the film; however, the following week, it would be announced that Netflix had cancelled the film and put it in turnaround, following disagreements on the budget. Meyers had been seeking $150 million, but Netflix was unwilling to go beyond the set budget of $130 million.

In January 2026, Warner Bros. Pictures revived the project, with Cruz and Wilson staying on the cast, and Kieran Culkin, Jude Law, and Emma Mackey joining. Johansson and Fassbender exited the project, with Johansson opting to join Mike Flanagan's The Exorcist: Martyrs (2027). Adam Driver had also been circling a role, but would drop out due to commitments to Heat 2. Mackey exited the project in February, with the role being recast. In March 2026, Erin Doherty joined the cast, replacing Mackey. In May 2026, Tony Hale, Beverly D'Angelo and Apple Martin joined the cast.

=== Filming ===
Principal photography began in Los Angeles on May 17, 2026, and wrapped on September 17. The budget was reportedly $120 million.

== Release ==
Paris Paramount is scheduled to be released in the United States by Warner Bros. Pictures on December 25, 2027.
