= Pippa Bennett-Warner =

English actress (born 1988)

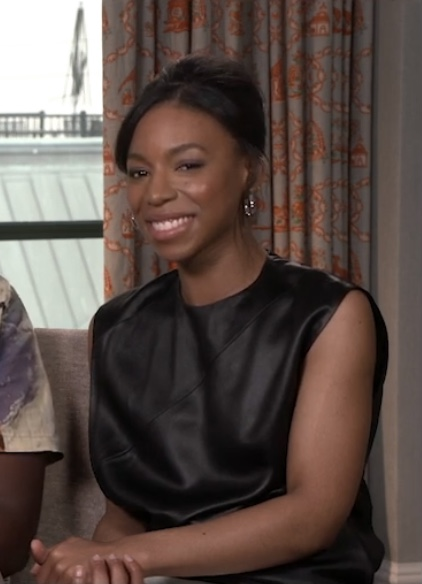
- Bennett-Warner in 2022
- Born: Philippa Elaine Fanti Warner; 23 July 1988 (age 38); Banbury, Oxfordshire, England
- Occupation: Actress
- Years active: 1999–present

Philippa Elaine Fanti Bennett-Warner (born 23 July 1988) is a British actress. She began her career as a child actress, playing young Nala in the original West End production of The Lion King (1999). She went on to earn WhatsOnStage and Ian Charleson Award nominations for her roles in the musical Caroline, or Change (2006) and Michael Grandage's King Lear (2010) respectively.

On television, Bennett-Warner starred in the Sky Atlantic crime drama Gangs of London (2020–present) and the BBC thrillers Roadkill (2020) and Chloe (2022).

In video games, Bennett-Warner is best known for providing the voice for the character Malenia in the FromSoftware game Elden Ring (2022).

== Early life ==
Bennett-Warner was brought up in Buckinghamshire, and was educated at St Edward's School in Oxford, and Lucie Clayton Charm Academy. She is of Jamaican and Kittitian descent, and has a sister, Georgina, who is three years older.

== Career ==
=== Early work (1999–2009) ===
She started her acting career in Julie Taymor's 1999 London production of The Lion King, as one of the original young Nalas.

In 2006, she got a place at Royal Academy of Dramatic Art and the role of Emmie Thibodeaux in the musical Caroline, or Change, for which she was nominated for the Whatsonstage.com Stuart Phillips London Newcomer of the Year award 2007, alongside Andrew Garfield. She went on to star in the lead role in Athol Fugard's UK premiere of Victory for the Peter Hall Company and then went to RADA in September 2007.

Bennett-Warner graduated from RADA in 2010, but left early to take on the role of Sophie in Lynn Nottage's Ruined at the Almeida Theatre. Before completing the course she was awarded the prestigious Carleton Hobbs Radio Award. However, due to another job commitment she was unable to join the radio rep.

After finishing Ruined, a two-hander (Crocodile, written by Frank McGuinness) with Sinéad Cusack for Sky Arts followed. During this time Bennett-Warner was cast in Michael Grandage's award-winning King Lear as Cordelia, with Derek Jacobi in the title role. Before rehearsals started for King Lear in October, she filmed small parts in Come Fly With Me with David Walliams and Ashley Lucas and also in Case Histories alongside Jason Isaacs.

=== Breakthrough (2010–present) ===
Bennett-Warner received an Ian Charleson commendation for King Lear. She then took the role of Denise in D. C. Moore's new play The Swan — in a role that had been written for her – at the National Theatre followed by playing Queen Isabel in Michael Grandage's swan song Richard II at the Donmar Warehouse with Eddie Redmayne in the title role and Andrew Buchan as Bolingbroke in 2010. She received positive reviews from the critics, with Kate Bassett from The Independent saying: "Both of them (Redmayne and Buchan) are, in fact, outshone by Pippa Bennett-Warner in the cameo role of Isabel, Richard’s devoted, fiery queen."

In 2012, she played the lead role in Vivienne Franzmann's second play The Witness, at the Royal Court Theatre. She received rave reviews with Susannah Clapp from The Observer stating, "Always thought Pippa Bennett-Warner had big future. Now she is having it in 'The Witness' at Royal Court...There are actresses (even actors) who are more flashy, who more obviously inflect every detail of a speech. PBW is completely natural. Audiences of course admire her: but they do something else, which is not always the same thing: they believe her". Bennett-Warner went on to secure a nomination for Best Actress at the Evening Standard Theatre Awards 2012, alongside Cate Blanchett and Eileen Atkins and was named as one of the 1,000 Most Influential Londoners in 2012 in the category "Generation Next" by The Evening Standard.

In 2016, she narrated Zadie Smith's book Swing Time. From 2018 to 2019 she played the title role in The Maya Angelou Autobiographies for BBC Radio 4. In 2020, she narrated Bernardine Evaristo's Girl, Woman, Other for the BBC.

== Personal life ==
She is an Ambassador for The Theatres Trust.

Bennett-Warner is good friends with Jonathan Bailey who she appeared with in Doctor Who's "Time Heist" episode in 2014. Bailey also photographed her for a profile for Rose & Ivy magazine in 2021.

== Acting roles ==
=== Film ===
Year	Title	Role	Notes
2016	Patient Zero	Linda	
2016	Wakefield	Emily	
2017	The Foreigner	Marissa Levitt	
2018	Johnny English Strikes Again	Lesley	
2020	Real	Jamie	
2021	Open	Naomi	
2022	See How They Run	Ann Saville	
2022	A Bit of Light	Bethan	
2024	Magpie	Esther	
2026	The Magic Faraway Tree	Hannah	

=== Television ===
Year	Title	Role	Notes
2002	Holby City	Gemma Webber	Episode: "Leopard Spots"
2003	Lenny Henry in Pieces	Jessica	
2010	Crocodile	Girl	TV film
2011	National Theatre Live	Cordelia	Episode: "King Lear"
2011	Come Fly With Me	Lisa	2 episodes
2011	Case Histories	Emma Drake	Episode: "Case Histories"
2012	Lewis	Nina Clemens	Episode: "The Indelible Stain"
2012	Inspector George Gently	Delores Kenny	Episode: "Gently Northern Soul"
2012	Agatha Christie's Marple	Victoria	Episode: "A Caribbean Mystery"
2012	Southcliffe	Susannah	TV mini-series
2013	Vera	Manda/Sister Claire	Episode: "Young Gods"
2013	Death in Paradise	Rosie Curloo	
2014	The Smoke	Ziggy Brown	8 episodes
2014	Law & Order: UK	Zana Washington	Episode: "Repeat to Fade"
2014	The Secrets	Lorna	TV mini-series
2014	Doctor Who	Saibra	Episode: "Time Heist"
2015	National Theatre Live	Dorinda	Episode: "The Beaux' Stratagem"
2015	The Trials of Jimmy Rose	Kerry Irwin	TV mini-series
2015	River	Tia Edwards	
2016–2019	Harlots	Harriet Lennox	TV series
2017–2018	Sick Note	Becca Palmerstone	
2018	Silent Witness	DC Heidi Bailey	2 episodes
2019	MotherFatherSon	Lauren Elgood	TV series
2020	Sitting in Limbo	Eileen	TV film
2020	Unsaid Stories: Look at Me	Kay	TV short film
2020	Roadkill	Rochelle Madeley	TV series
2020	Maxxx	Tamzin	TV series
2020–present	Gangs of London	Shannon Dumani	TV series
2022	Chloe	Livia	TV series
2023	Obsession	Peggy Graham	Miniseries
2024	Moonflower Murders	Madeleine Cain	TV series
2025	The Woman in Cabin 10	Karla	Netflix

=== Theatre ===
- 1999 The Lion King, Young Nala, Lyceum Theatre
- 2006 Caroline or Change by Tony Kushner, Emmie Thibodeaux, National Theatre
- 2007 Victory by Athol Fugard, Vicky, Theatre Royal Bath
- 2010 Ruined by Lynn Nottage, Sophie, Almeida Theatre
- 2010 Crocodile by Frank McGuiness, Girl, Riverside Studios
- 2010 King Lear by William Shakespeare, Cordelia, Donmar Warehouse, BAM
- 2011 The Swan by D.C. Moore, Denise, National Theatre
- 2011 Richard II by William Shakespeare, Queen Isabel, Donmar Warehouse
- 2012 The Witness by Vivienne Franzmann, Alex, Royal Court Theatre
- 2015 The Beaux' Stratagem by George Farquhar, Dorinda, Royal National Theatre

=== Radio ===
- The White Devil as Zanche (BBC Radio 3, 2010)
- Their Eyes Were Watching God as Janie (BBC World drama, 2010)
- The Great Gatsby as Daisy Buchanan (BBC Radio 4, 2012)
- The Witness as Alex (BBC Radio 3, 2013)
- Doctor Thorne as Mary Thorne (BBC Radio 4, 2014)
- The Awakening as Edna Pontellier (BBC Radio 4, 2014)
- Everyday Time Machines as Samantha (BBC Radio 3, 2014)
- The Ice Wife as Kate (BBC Radio 4, 2014)
- Paterson as Marie (BBC Radio 3, 2014)
- Talisman as Edie (BBC Radio 4, 2014)
- Dinner as Sian (BBC Radio 4, 2015)
- Heat and Dust as Olivia (BBC Radio 4, 2015)
- Inspector Chen as Catherine Rohn (BBC Radio 4, 2015)
- Beloved as Denver (BBC Radio 4, 2015)
- Wolf in the Water as Jessica (BBC Radio 3, 2016)
- The Maya Angelou Autobiographies as Maya Angelou (BBC Radio 4 2018–2019)

=== Video games ===
- Elden Ring as Malenia, Blade of Miquella (2022)
- Xenoblade Chronicles 3 as Monica Vandham (2022)
