= Tim Fywell =

British film and television director

Tim Fywell is an English television and film director. In 2003 he made his first feature debut with I Capture the Castle, an adaptation of the novel of the same title by Dodie Smith. Fywell directed his first Hollywood feature, Ice Princess starring Michelle Trachtenberg, in 2005. Fywell started his career in British television, directing episodes of Brookside.

== Selected filmography ==
- Brookside (TV Series, unknown episodes)
- Bergerac (TV Series, one episode: "All the Sad Songs", 1990)
- Gallowglass (TV, 1993)
- Cracker (TV series, episodes: 1994–95; serials: "To Be A Somebody" and "True Romance")
- Norma Jean & Marilyn (TV, 1996)
- The Woman in White (TV, 1997)
- Madame Bovary (TV, 2000)
- I Capture the Castle (2003)
- Cambridge Spies (TV, 2003)
- Hear the Silence (TV, 2003)
- Ice Princess (2005)
- Half Broken Things (TV, 2007)
- Waking the Dead (TV, 8 episodes, 2007–2011)
- Affinity (TV, 2008)
- The No. 1 Ladies' Detective Agency (TV, 2009)
- The Turn of the Screw (TV, 2009)
- Happy Valley (TV, 2 episodes, 2014)
- The English Game (TV, 2020)
