= Juliet Stevenson =

English actress (born 1956)

Juliet Stevenson CBE
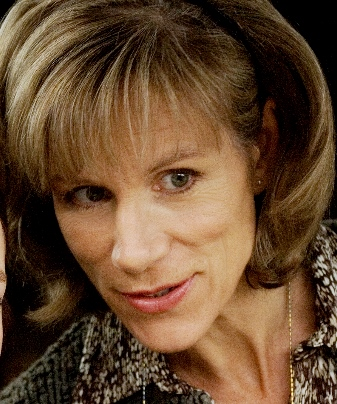
- Stevenson in Dustbin Baby (2008)
- Born: Juliet Anne Virginia Stevenson; 30 October 1956 (age 69); Kelvedon, Essex, England
- Education: Royal Academy of Dramatic Art
- Occupations: Actress and narrator
- Years active: 1978–present
- Spouse: Hugh Brody (m. 2021)
- Children: 2

Juliet Anne Virginia Stevenson, CBE (born 30 October 1956) is an English actress of stage and screen, and a narrator. She is known for her role in the film Truly, Madly, Deeply (1991), for which she was nominated for the BAFTA Award for Best Actress in a Leading Role. Her other film appearances include Emma (1996), Bend It Like Beckham (2002), Mona Lisa Smile (2003), Being Julia (2004), Infamous (2006), The Enfield Haunting (2015), Wolf (2023), and Reawakening (2024).

In theatre, she has starred in numerous Royal Shakespeare Company and National Theatre productions, including Olivier Award nominated roles in Measure for Measure (1984), Les Liaisons Dangereuses (1986), and Yerma (1987). For her role as Paulina in Death and the Maiden (1991–92), she won the 1992 Olivier Award for Best Actress. Her fifth Olivier nomination was for her work in the 2009 revival of Duet for One. She has also received three nominations for the BAFTA TV Award for Best Actress: for A Doll's House (1992), The Politician's Wife (1995) and Accused (2010). Other stage roles include The Heretic (2011) and Happy Days (2014).

== Early life ==
Stevenson was born in Kelvedon, Essex, England, the daughter of Virginia Ruth (née Marshall), a teacher, and Michael Guy Stevenson, an army officer. Stevenson's father was assigned a new posting every two and a half years. When Stevenson was nine, she attended Berkshire's Hurst Lodge School in Ascot, and she was later educated at the independent St Catherine's School in Bramley, near Guildford, Surrey, and at the Royal Academy of Dramatic Art (RADA). Stevenson was part of the 'new wave' of actors to emerge from the Academy. Others included Jonathan Pryce, Bruce Payne, Alan Rickman, Anton Lesser, Kenneth Branagh, Imelda Staunton and Fiona Shaw. She started her stage career in 1978 with the Royal Shakespeare Company.

== Career ==
Although she has gained fame through her television and film work and has often undertaken roles for BBC Radio, she is known as a stage actress. Significant stage roles include her performances as Isabella in Measure for Measure, Madame de Tourvel in Les Liaisons Dangereuses, Anna in the UK premiere of Burn This in 1990 and Paulina in Death and the Maiden at the Royal Court theatre and the West End (1991–92). For the last she was awarded the 1992 Laurence Olivier Award for Best Actress.

In the 1987 TV film Life Story, Stevenson played the part of scientist Rosalind Franklin, for which she won a Cable Ace award. She played the leading role in the Anthony Minghella film Truly, Madly, Deeply (1991) and her roles in The Secret Rapture (1993), Emma (1996), Bend It Like Beckham (2002) and Mona Lisa Smile (2003). She has more recently starred in Pierrepoint (2006), Infamous (2006) as Diana Vreeland and Breaking and Entering (2006) as Rosemary, the therapist. In 2003, she played the mother of an autistic child in the television film Hear the Silence, a film promoting the now debunked claims of Andrew Wakefield that the MMR vaccine was responsible for autism in children. The film makers and Stevenson were criticised as Wakefield's professionalism was already seriously in doubt.

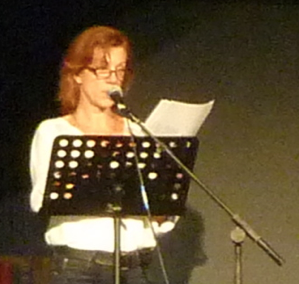
Stevenson speaking at the 2011 Latitude Festival.

In 2008, she starred in ITV's A Place of Execution. The role won her the Best Actress Dagger at the 2009 Crime Thriller Awards. She performs as a book reader, and has recorded all of Jane Austen's novels as unabridged audiobooks, as well as a number of other novels, such as Lady Windermere's Fan, Hedda Gabler, Stories from Shakespeare, and To the Lighthouse. She received lifetime achievement prize at Women in Film And TV awards.

In 2024, she played Mary, the mother of a returning missing child in the British psychological thriller film Reawakening, alongside Erin Doherty and Jared Harris.

== Personal life ==
Stevenson married her long-time partner, British anthropologist Hugh Brody, in 2021. They have a daughter and a son and live in Suffolk, but she also has an apartment in New York. She is an atheist but considers herself a spiritual and superstitious person.

In 2008, she campaigned on behalf of refugee women with a reading at the Young Vic of Motherland, in protest against conditions at Yarl's Wood immigration detention centre. Directed by Stevenson, with a script written by Natasha Walter, Motherland was described in The Guardian as "an intelligent and shocking piece of theatre", with Anthony Barnett characterising it as "skilful and engrossing, a mixture of drama and performance, witness and testimony, music and reporting."

Stevenson is patron of the UK registered charity LAM Action, which provides support, information and encouragement to patients with Lymphangioleiomyomatosis (LAM) and their families, and raises funds to advance research into LAM. She is also an Amnesty Ambassador, and is patron of two other charities: Young Roots, a charity for young refugees; and Antenatal Results and Choices, which supports parents who have had a diagnosis of fetal anomaly.

On 12 September 2016, Stevenson, as well as Cate Blanchett, Chiwetel Ejiofor, Peter Capaldi, Douglas Booth, Neil Gaiman, Keira Knightley, Jesse Eisenberg, Kit Harington and Stanley Tucci, featured in a video from the United Nations' refugee agency UNHCR to help raise awareness of the global refugee crisis. The video, titled "What They Took With Them", has the actors reading a poem written by Jenifer Toksvig and inspired by primary accounts of refugees, and is part of UNHCR's #WithRefugees campaign, which also includes a petition to governments to expand asylum to provide further shelter, integrating job opportunities and education.

Stevenson's friends and frequent collaborators include director Robert Icke, comedian and feminist broadcaster Deborah Frances-White, poet Aviva Dautch and concert pianist Lucy Parham.

Stevenson is also a painter and has talked about how her art has helped her through difficult moments such as the COVID-19 lockdown and the death of her stepson.

Stevenson regularly attends protests in support of the people of Palestine. On 30 November 2024, she spoke at the National March for Palestine in London, highlighting the difference in the way the plight of the Palestinian people is portrayed in comparison to other people, and saying: "As artists we cannot remain silent in the face of such gross violations. Violations of human rights and of international law. Violations of the truth and of every human instinct." In September 2025, she signed an open pledge with Film Workers for Palestine pledging not to work with Israeli film institutions "that are implicated in genocide and apartheid against the Palestinian people." She also spoke out in favour of proscribed terrorist organisation, Palestine Action.

== Filmography ==
=== Film ===
Year	Title	Role	Notes
1988	Drowning by Numbers	Cissie Colpitts 2	
1990	Ladder of Swords	Alice Howard	
1990	The March	Clare Fitzgerald	
1990	Truly, Madly, Deeply	Nina	
1993	The Trial	Fräulein Bürstner	
1993	The Secret Rapture	Isobel Coleridge	
1996	Emma	Augusta Hawkins Elton	
2001	Play	Second Woman	Short film
2001	Christmas Carol: The Movie	Mrs. Cratchit / Mother Gimlet (voice)	
2001	The Search for John Gissing	Gwenyth Moore	
2002	Food of Love	Pamela Porterfield	
2002	Bend It Like Beckham	Paula Paxton	
2002	Nicholas Nickleby	Mrs. Squeers	
2003	Mona Lisa Smile	Amanda Armstrong	
2004	Being Julia	Evie	
2005	Pierrepoint: The Last Hangman	Anne Fletcher	
2005	Red Mercury	Sofia Warburton	
2006	Infamous	Diana Vreeland	
2006	Breaking and Entering	Rosemary McCloud	
2007	And When Did You Last See Your Father?	Kim Morrison	
2008	A Previous Engagement	Julia Reynolds	
2008	The Secret of Moonacre	Miss Heliotrope	
2009	Quietus	Jayne	Short film
2009	Desert Flower	Lucinda	
2009	Triage	Amy	aka: Shell Shock
2013	Diana	Sonia	
2013	Penelope	Penny	Short film
2014	The Letters	Mother Teresa	
2014	The Portrait	Laura Burrell	Short film
2014	Mayday	May	Short film
2015	Departure	Beatrice	
2016	Love Is Thicker Than Water	Ethel	
2016	Let Me Go	Helga	
2018	London Unplugged	Jayne	
2019	Four	The Dowager	Short film
2022	Walls Like Windows	Maggie	Short film
2022	Ceres	Ceres	Short film
2024	Reawakening	Mary	
2024	Rhoda	Rhoda	Short film
2026	Elsinore	Sylvia Syms	
2026	A Talent for Murder	Peggy	
TBA	Black Palace †	TBA	Post-production

=== Television ===
Year	Title	Role	Notes
1980	The Mallens	Barbara Mallen/Bensham	6 episodes
1981	Maybury	Joanna Langston	Episodes: "A Fall from Grace", "What I Mean Is...", "Ten Green Bottles"
1983	Bazaar and Rummage	Fliss	TV film
1984	Crown Court	Catherine Lloyd	Episodes: "Dirty Washing: Parts 1–3"
1984	Freud	Elizabeth von Reitberg	Mini-series; episode: "The Secret of Dreams"
1984	Pericles, Prince of Tyre	Thaisa	Part of the BBC Television Shakespeare
1986	The Theban Plays by Sophocles	Antigone	Episodes: "Oedipus at Colonus", "Antigone"
1987	Horizon	Rosalind Franklin	Episode: "Life Story"
1988	ScreenPlay	Ruth	Episode: "Out of Love"
1988	Screen Two	Hilda Carline	Episode: "Stanley"
1988	This is David Lander	Penny Foster	Episode: "The Nicholson Story"
1990	The Jim Henson Hour	Vicky Marshall	Episode: "Living with Dinosaurs" (originally aired in UK, 1989)
1991	4 Play	Margaret	Episode: "In the Border Country"
1991	Screen Two	Lucy	Episode: "Aimée"
1992	A Doll's House	Nora Helmer	Part of the BBC's Performance series
1993	The Legends of Treasure Island	Jane (voice)	Main role; 13 episodes
1993	Who Dealt?	Tom's Wife	Short story in the form of a monologue by Ring Lardner
1993	The Trial	Fraulein Burstner	Part of the BBC's Screen Two
1994	Verdi	Giuseppina Strepponi (voice)	TV film
1995	The Politician's Wife	Flora Matlock	Mini-series; all 3 episodes
1997	Screen Two	Jean	Episode: "Stone, Scissors, Paper"
1998	Cider with Rosie	Annie Lee	TV film
1999	Trial by Fire	Helen West	TV film
2002	The Road from Coorain	Eve	TV film
2002	The Pact	Gus Harte	TV film
2003	Hear the Silence	Christine Shields	TV film
2005	The Snow Queen	Gerda's Mother	TV film
2007	Agatha Christie's Marple	Gwenda Vaughn	Episode: "Ordeal by Innocence"
2008	10 Days to War	Elizabeth Wilmshurst	Mini-series; episode: "A Simple Private Matter"
2008	Place of Execution	Catherine Heathcote	Mini-series; 3 episodes
2008	Dustbin Baby	Marion Bean	TV film
2010	Law & Order: UK	Rachel Callaghan	Episode: "Denial"
2010	Accused	Helen Ryland	Episode: "Helen's Story"
2011	Lewis	Diana Ellerby	Episode: "Old, Unhappy, Far Off Things"
2011	The Hour	Lady Elms	Recurring role; 4 episodes
2012	White Heat	Charlotte (Present Day)	Mini-series; 6 episodes
2013–2014	The Village	Clem Allingham	Main role; 12 episodes
2013–2015	Atlantis	The Oracle	Main role; 12 episodes
2014	On Angel Wings	Mary (voice)	TV short film
2015	X Company	Mayor Marie Bellaire	Episode: "Walk with the Devil"
2015	The Enfield Haunting	Betty Grosse	Mini-series; 3 episodes
2015	Artsnight	Contributor	Episode: "Richard Wilson on Samuel Beckett"
2016	One of Us	Louise Elliot	Mini-series; 4 episodes
2018	Hamlet	Gertrude	BBC film of the Almeida Theatre production
2019	Riviera	Lady Cassandra Eltham	10 episodes
2020	Out of Her Mind	Carol	Series regular; 6 episodes
2021	The Long Call	Dorothy Venn	Main role; 4 episodes
2021	Death in Paradise	Natasha Carlton	Christmas Special
2022	The Man Who Fell to Earth	Sister Mary Lou Prescott	Episodes: "Under Pressure", "The Pretty Things Are Going to Hell"
2022–2026	Professor T.	Dr. Helena Goldberg	Recurring role; 21 episodes
2023	Secret Invasion	Elizabeth Hill	Mini-series; episode: "Promises"
2023	Wolf	Matilda Anchor-Ferrers	6 episodes
2025	A Cruel Love: The Ruth Ellis Story	Charity Taylor	Mini-series; 4 episodes
2025	King & Conqueror	Lady Emma	4 episodes
2025	The Deal	Cindy Cohen	6 episodes
2026	Dustfall	Olivia Pollard	TV series

=== Narration ===
In addition to her acting work, Stevenson has provided voice-overs for numerous film and TV documentaries, including:

- Horizon (6 episodes; 1988–2005)
- Greek Fire (9 episodes; 1990–1991)
- Equinox (1 episode; 1992)
- The World of Eric Carle (1 episode; 1993)
- Network First (1 episode; 1994)
- Paris Was a Woman (film, 1996)
- Anglia at Peace (4 episodes; 1996)
- Evita, una tumba sin paz (film, 1997)
- An Awfully Big Adventure (1 episode; 1998)
- B.P. Confidential! (TV film, 1998)
- Secret History (2 episodes; 1999, 2000)
- Hidden Love (1 episode; 2000)
- Animated Tales of the World (1 episode; 2000)
- The Real... (2 episodes; 2000, 2002)
- The Great Sperm Race (TV film, 2003)
- The Hunt for the Camden Ripper (TV film, 2004)
- Why Intelligence Fails (mini-series; 2004)
- John Wyndham: The Invisible Man of Science Fiction (TV film, 2005)
- Israel and the Arabs: Elusive Peace (3 episodes; 2005)
- Cutting Edge (2 episodes; 2005, 2006)
- In Search of Mozart (film, 2006)
- Dispatches (1 episode; 2007)
- London Calling: Inside BBC World Service (3 episodes; 2007)
- I Can't Believe I'm Telling You This (TV film, 2008)
- Arena (1 episode; 2008)
- In Search of Beethoven (film, 2009)
- True Stories (1 episode; 2011)
- In Search of Haydn (film, 2012)
- Russia's Open Book: Writing in the Age of Putin (film, 2013)
- Natural World (5 episodes; 2013–2016)
- In Search of Chopin (film, 2014)
- Pakistan's Hidden Shame (film, 2014)
- Invictus Games (TV series, 2014)
- 60 Years of Carols from King's (TV Special, 2014)
- 1066: A Year to Conquer England (3 episodes; 2017)
- Russia 1917: Countdown to Revolution (TV film, 2017)
- Queens of Mystery (12 episodes; 2019–2021)
- Wander (short film, 2020)
- Shakespeare: Rise of a Genius (3 episodes; 2023)
- Mozart: Rise of a Genius (3 episodes; 2024)
- Jane Austen: Rise of a Genius (3 episodes; 2025)

== Theatre ==
Year	Title	Role	Notes
1978	The Tempest	Spirit	Royal Shakespeare Company
1978	Antony and Cleopatra	Iras / Octavia	Royal Shakespeare Company
1978	Measure for Measure	Whore / Nun	Royal Shakespeare Company
1978	The Churchill Play	Caroline Thompson	
1978	Hippolytus	Aphrodite / Artemis	
1978	Lovers and Kings		
1978	The Taming of the Shrew	Widow / Curtis	
1978	The White Guard	Yeliena	
1978	Once in a Lifetime	Miss Chasen	
1980	Henry IV	Lady Percy	Royal Shakespeare Company
1981	A Midsummer Night's Dream	Hippolyta / Titania	
1981	The Witch of Edmonton	Susan	Royal Shakespeare Company
1981	Money	Clara Douglas	
1983	Other Worlds	Emma / Betsy	Royal Court Theatre, London
1984	Measure for Measure	Isabella	Royal Shakespeare Company, Stratford Theatre
1984	Breaking the Silence	Polya	Royal Shakespeare Company, The Pit Theatre, London
1985	Troilus and Cressida	Cressida	Royal Shakespeare Company, Stratford Theatre
1985	As You Like It	Rosalind	Royal Shakespeare Company, Stratford Theatre
1986	Les Liaisons Dangereuses	Madame de Tourvel	Royal Shakespeare Company, The Pit Theatre
1987	Yerma	Yerma	National Theatre, London
1988–1990	The Trackers of Oxyrhynchus	Kyllene	Theatre of Delphi/National Theatre, London
1989	Hedda Gabler	Hedda	National Theatre, London
1989	On the Verge	Fanny	Sadler's Wells Theatre, London
1990	Burn This	Anna	Hampstead Theatre, London
1991–1992	Death and the Maiden	Paulina	Theatre Upstairs, Duke of York Theatre, London
1993	Scenes from an Execution	Galactia	Mark Taper Forum, Los Angeles
1995	The Duchess of Malfi		Greenwich Theatre/Wyndham's Theatre, London
1997	The Caucasian Chalk Circle		Royal National Theatre, London
1999	Private Lives	Amanda	The National Theatre
2000	The Country		Royal Court Theatre
2003	A Little Night Music	Desirée Armfeldt	New York City Opera
2004	We Happy Few		Gielgud Theatre, London
2005	The Alice Trilogy		Royal Court Theatre
2006	The Seagull	Irina Arkadina	The National Theatre
2009	Duet for One	Stephanie Anderson	London
2011	The Heretic	Dr Diane Cassell	Royal Court Theatre
2014–2015	Happy Days	Winnie	Young Vic
2016–2018	Mary Stuart	Mary Stuart / Elizabeth I	Almeida Theatre & Duke of York's Theatre
2017	Hamlet	Gertrude	Almeida Theatre & Harold Pinter Theatre
2019, 2020, 2022, 2023	The Doctor	Professor Ruth Wolff	Almeida Theatre; Adelaide Festival; UK Tour & Duke of York's Theatre; Park Avenue Armory, New York

== Audio recordings ==
A partial list of Stevenson's audio recordings:

- Man and Superman, BBC Audiobooks, 1998 (Broadcast on BBC Radio 4 in 1996). Production featured Juliet Stevenson, Ralph Fiennes and Judi Dench. It also included an interview with the director, Peter Hall
- Old Possum's Book of Practical Cats, Penguin Audiobooks, 1997
- The Plague Tales, BDD, c. 1997
- Hamlet by William Shakespeare, BBC Radio Collection, 1999 (with Michael Sheen)
- When Love Speaks (2002, EMI Classics) – "Sonnet 128" ("How oft, when thou, my music ...")
- Who's Afraid of Virginia Woolf? (2004 BBC Radio 3)
- The Thirteenth Tale by Diane Setterfield, Unabridged, Orion audiobook (2006)
- Northanger Abbey by Jane Austen. Unabridged, Naxos audiobook, 7 CDs (2006)
- Persuasion by Jane Austen. Unabridged, Naxos audiobook, 7 CDs (2007)
- Mansfield Park by Jane Austen. Unabridged, Naxos audiobook, 14 CDs (2007)
- Emma by Jane Austen. Unabridged, Naxos audiobook, 13 CDs (2007)
- Sense and Sensibility by Jane Austen, Unabridged, Naxos audiobook (2007)
- Lady Audley's Secret by Mary Elizabeth Braddon. Abridged, CSA Word Classic, 4 CDs (2007)
- The Tenant of Wildfell Hall by Anne Brontë
- I, Coriander by Sally Gardner
- The King's General by Daphne du Maurier
- An Unequal Marriage by Emma Tennant
- From Shakespeare with Love by William Shakespeare. David Tennant (narrator), Juliet Stevenson (narrator), Anton Lesser (narrator), Alex Jennings (narrator)
- Rebecca, Frenchman's Creek & My Cousin Rachel (Daphne du Maurier Collection) by Daphne du Maurier. Juliet Stevenson (narrator), Daniel Massey (narrator), Michael Maloney (narrator)
- A Room with a View by E.M. Forster
- The London Tapes by Juliet Stevenson
- Ancient and Modern by Sue Gee (2004)
- Alentejo Blue by Monica Ali, abridged (2006)
- North and South by Elizabeth Gaskell, unabridged (2009)
- The Golden Notebook by Doris Lessing (2010)
- A Room of One's Own by Virginia Woolf (2011)
- Middlemarch by George Eliot. Unabridged, Naxos Audiobooks (2011)
- Goldfish Girl by Peter Souter (2011)
- Mary Poppins by P. L. Travers (2012)
- The Signature of All Things by Elizabeth Gilbert (2013)
- The Paying Guests by Sarah Waters, unabridged (2014)
- Apple Tree Yard by Louise Doughty, unabridged (2014)
- Belgravia by Julian Fellowes, (2016)
- Miss Marple’s Final Cases by Agatha Christie (2022)
- Stevenson's speaking voice is heard in the historical symposium which opens and closes the production of The Handmaid's Tale at English National Opera in 2024.

== Honours ==
In the 1999 Queens Birthday Honours, Stevenson was appointed a Commander of the Order of the British Empire (CBE).

She is a patron of the London International Festival of Theatre.

== Awards and nominations ==
=== Film ===
Year	Award	Category	Work	Result
1992	British Academy Film Award	Best Actress in a Leading Role	Truly, Madly, Deeply	Nominated

=== Television ===
Year	Award	Category	Work	Result
1993	British Academy Television Award	Actress	A Doll's House	Nominated
1996	British Academy Television Award	Actress	The Politician's Wife	Nominated
2011	British Academy Television Award	Leading Actress	Accused	Nominated
2019	Primetime Emmy Award	Outstanding Narrator	Queens of Mystery (Episode: "Murder in the Dark: First Chapter")	Nominated

=== Theatre ===
Year	Award	Category	Nominated work	Result
1983	Critics' Circle Theatre Award	Best Actress	Measure for Measure	Won
1984	Laurence Olivier Award	Actress of the Year in a Revival	Measure for Measure	Nominated
1986	Laurence Olivier Award	Best Actress	As You Like It, Les Liaisons Dangereuses and Troilus and Cressida	Nominated
1987	Laurence Olivier Award	Best Actress	Yerma	Nominated
1992	Laurence Olivier Award	Best Actress	Death and the Maiden	Won
2009	Evening Standard Theatre Award	Best Actress	Duet for One	Nominated
2010	Laurence Olivier Award	Best Actress	Duet for One	Nominated
2019	Evening Standard Theatre Award	Best Actress	The Doctor	Nominated
2019	Critics' Circle Theatre Award	Best Actress	The Doctor	Won
2020	Laurence Olivier Award	Best Actress	The Doctor	Nominated
2024	Drama Desk Award	Lead Performance in a Play	The Doctor	Nominated

== See also ==
- List of British actors
- List of atheists in film, radio, television and theater
