= Anthony Steven =

British television scriptwriter (1916–1990)

- Born: William Anthony Guy Steven; 3 August 1916; Surrey, England
- Died: 26 May 1990 (aged 73); Surrey, England
- Occupation: television scriptwriter

Anthony Steven (3 August 1916 – 26 May 1990) was a British television scriptwriter whose career spanned over three decades. Notable works include All Creatures Great and Small, The Prime of Miss Jean Brodie and The Forsyte Saga.

== Career ==
Anthony Steven began his career as a reporter on the Oxford Mail. Later, he was discovered by John Grierson, the founder of the Crown Film Unit, who hired him as a writer.

In 1957 Steven joined the BBC. A prolific writer, he wrote many television serials over a period of thirty years. Some of his scripts were original but many were adaptations of classic novels, including several episodes of The Forsyte Saga (1967). In 1984, he wrote the script for the Doctor Who story The Twin Dilemma, the first to star Colin Baker as the Sixth Doctor. Steven claimed his typewriter had exploded whilst he was working on the script.
