= Helen Blatch =

British actress (1934–2015)

Helen Christine Blatch (née Wilson; 24 January 1934 – 31 December 2015) was a British actress on stage and screen, best remembered on screen for her roles in Doctor Who (in the serials The Deadly Assassin and The Twin Dilemma) and The Practice, and on stage for her casting as "Cerimon, a lord of Ephesus", in the Royal Shakespeare Company's 1989–1990 performance of Pericles.

== Career ==
Born in Southampton, Hampshire, Blatch trained at The Questors Student Group Course, finishing in 1958, and performed with the Questors for some years afterwards. She spent some years in repertory, working with directors such as Sam Walters, David Scase, David Thacker and Phyllida Lloyd. Her performances attracted positive reviews ("Miss Blatch .. is capable of an extraordinary tranquillity of both voice and manner, against which slight nuances of intonation or expression register with great effect"; "Helen Blatch captures perfectly the fragility and neuroses of the regressing morphine addict living in a dream of the past"; "Helen Blatch is strong and striking ... Her wit is waspish, her frailty acute, her quest for affection chilling.")

She joined the Royal Shakespeare Company in 1989, and, in her first season there, was described by one reviewer as "a find". Her casting as Cerimon, "a lord of Ephesus", in Shakespeare's Pericles was considered by one contemporary reviewer as "a brilliant stroke, for Cerimon (Helen Blatch) becomes a healer whose urgent goodness and brightly pitched grief has us eating magic from her hand." Another reviewer said "this presentation of power within gentleness, strength within femininity, was profoundly impressive."

A 2004 survey of performances of Pericles said "Helen Blatch brought to the part a combination of compassionate humanity and priestly authority", and commented, "In a virtuoso piece of doubling, Helen Blatch went on to play the Bawd in brothel scenes that were positively Hogarthian in their fetid realism; by having one actress play parts so different, Thacker emphasized the way in which Pericles ... brings together contrasting extremes: here, .. juxtaposed in a single performer." Since Blatch's performance, Cerimon has often been cast as female.

Blatch appeared in many other classic and modern plays. For her role in Sir Peter Shaffer's The Gift of the Gorgon, she learned Greek from a 'How to Speak Greek' tape and tourist guidebook. Her performance in Sir David Hare's Racing Demon as "Espy's understandably unhappy wife" was particularly noted as "affecting ... their final scene of clenched and frigid misery sends a shiver down the spine." She appeared in films also (including different roles in two versions of A Doll's House) and in many TV series. Her longest-enduring television role was as Nora Madkay in the ITV series The Practice, but she is perhaps best known for her two roles in Doctor Who: the voice of the Matrix in the 1976 serial The Deadly Assassin, and Fabian in the 1984 serial The Twin Dilemma.

=== Selected stage performances ===
Year	Title	Theatre	Role	Director
1966	Hecabe	Questors Theatre, Ealing	Polyxena	Alan Clarke
1968	Beware of the Dog	Birmingham Repertory Theatre	She	Peter Jefferies
1971	Tree	Little Theatre Club, Garrick Yard		Derek Oldfield
1973	Night	King's Head Theatre, Islington	The Woman	Sam Walters
1977	The Island	Orange Tree Theatre, Richmond	Dee	Roger Swaine
1980	Past Tense	Library Theatre, Manchester		David Scase
1980	Love's Old Sweet Song	Library Theatre, Manchester	Nan	Alan Meadows
1981	The Importance of Being Earnest	Duke's Playhouse, Lancaster	Lady Bracknell	David Thacker
1982	Long Day's Journey into Night	Duke's Playhouse, Lancaster	Mary Tyrone	David Thacker
1983	Just Between Ourselves	Haymarket Theatre, Leicester		Christopher Honer
1984	Rosencrantz and Guildenstern are Dead	Theatr Clwyd, Mold	Gertrude	George Roman
1986	The Cheeky Chappie	Library Theatre, Manchester		Howard Lloyd-Lewis
1986	Julius Caesar	The Young Vic	Calphurnia	David Thacker
1987	Just Between Ourselves	Everyman Theatre, Cheltenham		Phyllida Lloyd
1987	Cider With Rosie	Derby Playhouse		Martin Houghton
1988	Tom and Viv	Library Theatre, Manchester	Rose	Chris Honer
1988	Noises Off	Theatre Royal, York		Martin Houghton
1988	Woman In Mind	Library Theatre, Manchester	Susan	
1989	Pericles	Swan Theatre, Stratford-upon-Avon	Cerimon; Bawd	David Thacker
1989	The Duchess of Malfi	Swan Theatre, Stratford	Midwife	Bill Alexander
1990	Earwig	The Pit, Barbican Centre, London	Martha	Ron Daniels
1990	All's Well That Ends Well	Barbican, London	Widow Capilet	Barry Kyle
1990	Pericles	The Pit, Barbican Centre, London	Cerimon; Bawd	David Thacker
1990	The Duchess of Malfi	The Pit, Barbican Centre, London	Midwife	Bill Alexander
1991	Sex Please, We're Italian!	The Young Vic	Clotilde Salto	David Thacker
1991	The Snow Queen	The Young Vic		Karen Stephens and Chris White
1992	The Gift of the Gorgon	The Pit, Barbican Centre, London	Katina	Peter Hall
1992	Columbus: The Discovery of Japan	Barbican, London	Felipe Pinzon	John Caird
1993	The Gift of the Gorgon	Wyndham's Theatre, London	Katina	Peter Hall
1993	Live Like Pigs	Royal Court Theatre		Katie Mitchell
1994	Babies	Royal Court Theatre	Ivy Williams / Valerie Pinkney	Polly Teale
1995	The Knocky	Royal Court Theatre	Pearl (grandma)	Brian Stimer
1995-1996	The Tempest	The Young Vic; Swan Theatre, Stratford; UK tour	Mariner, Spirit	David Thacker
1995	Bingo: Scenes of Money and Death	Swan Theatre, Stratford	Old Woman	David Thacker
1997	Marat/Sade	Olivier Theatre	A newly-rich lady	Jeremy Sams
1997	Measure for Measure	Royal Lyceum, Edinburgh	Mistress Overdone and Sister Francisca	Stephane Braunschweig
1998	Racing Demon	Chichester Festival Theatre	Heather Espy	Christopher Morahan
1999	Sitting Pretty	Chelsea Centre, London		Jacob Murray
2001	Blood Red, Saffron Yellow	Theatre Royal, Plymouth	Daily cleaning woman	Jennie Darnell
2002	The Three Sisters	Orange Tree Theatre, Richmond	Anfisa	Sam Walters
2002	Three Sisters Two	Orange Tree Theatre, Richmond	Anfisa	Auriol Smith
2004	Humble Boy	Library Theatre, Manchester	Mercy	Roger Haines
2005	Arsenic and Old Lace	Derby Playhouse	Miss Brewster	Joseph Alford

=== Selected filmography ===
Year	Title	Role	Notes
1973	A Doll's House	Helene	Patrick Garland, director
1976	Doctor Who - The Deadly Assassin	Matrix (voice)	Two episodes
1979	Secret Army	Simone Borel	One episode
1980	Blake's 7	Receptionist	One episode
1984	Tenko	Mrs. Briggs	One episode
1984	Doctor Who - The Twin Dilemma	Fabian	One episode
1985	The Practice	Nora Madkay	12 episodes
1988	Coronation Street	Muriel Ashton	One episode
1992	A Touch of Frost	Annie	One episode
1992	A Doll's House	Anne-Marie	David Thacker, director
1991, 1993, 1997, 2002	The Bill	Four characters	Four episodes
1993	The Buddha of Suburbia	Pyke's Maid	Four episodes
1998	The Hello Girls	Aunt Helen	Two episodes
2001-2010	Doctors	Several characters	Several episodes

== Personal life ==
Blatch commented in a 2002 interview that she had entered the theatre against her father's wishes. It was announced in January 2018 that Blatch died on 31 December 2015, aged 82.
