= Hear the Silence =

British television drama

- Genre: Drama
- Written by: Timothy Prager
- Directed by: Tim Fywell
- Starring: Juliet Stevenson; Hugh Bonneville
- Music by: John Lunn
- Country of origin: United Kingdom
- Original language: English

Production
- Executive producers: Ivan Rendall; Timothy Prager
- Producer: Adrian Bate
- Cinematography: Ivan Strasburg
- Editor: Trevor Waite
- Running time: 90 minutes
- Production company: Zenith North
- Budget: £1 million

Original release
- Network: Five
- Release: 15 December 2003

Hear the Silence is a 2003 British semi-fictional drama television film based on the discredited idea of a potential link between the MMR vaccine and autism. By then, a contentious issue, the supposed connection originated in a paper by Andrew Wakefield published in 1998. The film was directed by Tim Fywell, written by Timothy Prager, and debuted on 15 December 2003 at 9 pm on the British network Five. Produced on a budget of £1 million, it stars Hugh Bonneville as Wakefield and Juliet Stevenson as Christine Shields, a fictional mother who discovers the possible MMR-autism link when her son is diagnosed as autistic.

== Synopsis ==
Christine Shields, who works in a senior capacity for a bank, begins informing a series of doctors that her son appeared to develop autism soon after he received the MMR vaccine, but she receives no sympathy from them, her boss, or even her husband. However, this all changes when she meets Wakefield, who shares her opinion of the MMR vaccine causing her son's autism. Shields is highly relieved at finding someone who believes her.

At the press conference at which Wakefield announces his research findings, mysterious figures are shown already plotting. Fictional government officials want to achieve Wakefield's "demise", which they intend to bring about by portraying his research as flawed. Although never demonstrated as being based on fact, the film depicts Wakefield being targeted by the government: his phone is tapped, and his files are stolen.

== Cast ==
(in credits order)

- Juliet Stevenson as Christine Shields
- Jamie Martin as Nicky Shields
- Stefan Mervyn as Max Shields (1 year old)
- Luke Mervyn as Max Shields (1 year old)
- Andrew Woodall as Martin Shields
- Hugh Bonneville as Andrew Wakefield
- Adie Allen as Dr. Carmel Wakefield
- Emma Pike as Emma
- Helen Kirkpatrick as Christine's secretary
- Todd Boyce as Simonson
- Emma Handy as Ann
- Felicity Montagu as Mary Watt
- Louis Doré as Philip Watt
- David Mallinson as Dr. Philip Ash
- Kish Sharma as ENT doctor
- Adrian Rawlins as Dr. Tony Danielson
- Paul Curran as Paediatrician
- Rosalind Bailey as Paediatric psychiatrist
- Simon Markey as Educational psychologist
- Diana Marchment as Woman shopper
- Harvey Virdi as Dr. Ash's receptionist
- Jan Harvey as Dr. Mead
- Richard Durden as Dr. Austen Parker
- Thomas Hunt as Max Shields (2 years old)
- Oliver Hunt as Max Shields (2 years old)
- Maurice Gleeson as Dr. Collier
- Rebecca Charles as Mother #1
- Caroline O'Neill as Anna Hoskins
- Denise Black as Valerie Park
- Denise Stephenson as Red-Headed woman
- Victoria Williams as Tessa Jowell
- Peter Halliday as Sir Kenneth Calman
- Gabrielle Jourdan as Sarah
- Emma Cleasby as Lisa - ABA
- Jack Le Breton as Jamie Park
- David Blair as Clean cut young man
- Hugh Walters as Dean Dr. Richard Stein
- Finlay Robertson as Journalist
- Fred Pearson as Dr. Terence Roberts
- Belle Mary Hithersay as Mother #2
- Paul Antony-Barber as Trust director
- Olivia Darnley as Wakefield's babysitter
- Simon Wilson as Worried father
- Sarah Woodward as Headmistress
- Jason Morell as Dr. Lyndon Gardner
- Cate Fowler as Headteacher

== Reception ==
Hear the Silence, according to unofficial overnight figures, attracted 1.2 million viewers on its first screening with a 6 per cent audience share; Channel Five's films debuting at 9 pm often gained audiences of more than 2 million viewers at the time. Mark Lawson in The Guardian wrote that Tim Fywell's direction "ensures that the piece, from its shivery beginnings onwards, has a flu-like hold on the viewer" and is "a fine piece of drama". The Times science writer Anjana Ahuja believed there were reasons to praise the drama as it contained a "powerful portrayal of autism, parental frustration and marital strains", despite its serious flaws. It was "deceitful, unbalanced and irresponsible", according to Mark Henderson in The Times, but also "slick, gripping and professional" and Juliet Stevenson gave an "outstanding" performance.

Otherwise, the film was received negatively, with critics arguing that it portrayed the purported MMR-autism link in a mistakenly sympathetic light as scientific evidence supporting the connection was lacking. It was said to idealize Wakefield and vilify the physicians who dismissed the vaccine-autism link by depicting them as "blatant caricatures" (British Medical Journal). Jon Joseph in The Times wrote "there are definitely no shades of grey" with Wakefield's assertions treated as if they are "a law of nature, like gravity". Of the supposed plot presumed to originate with the drug companies as a means to discredit Wakefield, Ben Goldacre wrote in The Guardian of its utter implausibility as the patent on the MMR vaccine had lapsed, it was now generic and no longer highly profitable.

Goldacre wrote that while the film was "moving and convincing" as a drama, it was factually inaccurate: "The only things that the writers of Hear the Silence get wrong, to be fair, are the science and the story." In addition, David Aaronovitch wrote that while the film begins by saying that it is a "dramatised account of the work of Dr Andrew Wakefield and his colleagues at the Royal Free Hospital in the late 1990s", the statement is not accurate. Aaronovitch commented: "Wakefield's own history is distorted, as are the opinions of his colleagues. No scientist is permitted to put a contrary case to that of the hero, though the vast majority of them believe he is wrong". Many years later, after Wakefield's paper had been discredited Aaronovitch described the drama as being "a piece of the purest propaganda".

An open letter from 11 leading British doctors working in paediatrics condemned the film, calling it "distorted" and "entirely unbalanced." One of the letter's signatories, Great Ormond Street Hospital paediatrician David Elliman, also called the film "overly sentimental" and "potentially dangerous".

== Aftermath ==
The discussion programme about the MMR-autism link following the film was a requirement of the broadcasting regulator's impartiality rules. Multiple doctors opposing Wakefield were invited to participate, but boycotted it on the grounds that they considered the film misleading. One of these doctors (David Salisbury, director of the British National Immunization Program) justified his decision to do so by saying that if he and his public health colleagues had appeared as the broadcasters had requested, "We felt we'd be giving respectability to a program that was not respectable." David Henderson in The Times thought the eventual discussion was "unreasonably weighted in Wakefield’s favour" and "no antidote to the two hours of emotional blackmail that preceded it". One of the participants in the programme, Anjana Ahuja, felt those questioning his research were in the minority and she regretted the decision of those doctors who had declined to appear. Ahuja described the discussion, hosted by Kirsty Young, as being "ill-tempered".

In 2008, responding to the criticism she had received at the time of the broadcast, Stevenson commented in a Daily Telegraph interview: "Perhaps it was naive of me to think you could put out a film like that" and "I thought it was generating an interesting debate and that it gave a voice to those who needed a voice - parents who were told they didn't know anything."
