= Peter Moffatt =

British television director (1922–2007)

- Born: 15 April 1922; Newington, London, England
- Died: 21 October 2007 (aged 85); London, England
- Occupation: Director
- Years active: 1960–1988
- Known for: Doctor Who
- Spouse: Joan Kemp-Welch (m. 1959; died 1999)

Peter Moffatt (15 April 1922 – 21 October 2007) was an English television director. His work includes Crane (1963), Breaking Point, All Creatures Great and Small (1978) and The Gentle Touch (1980). In 1981, he directed an episode of the Granada Television series Lady Killers. He also directed the BBC science fiction television series Doctor Who serials State of Decay (1980), The Visitation (1982), Mawdryn Undead (1983), "The Five Doctors" (1983), The Twin Dilemma (1984) and The Two Doctors (1985).
