= Reawakening =

2024 British film directed by Virginia Gilbert

- Directed by: Virginia Gilbert
- Written by: Virginia Gilbert
- Produced by: Virginia Gilbert; Barry Castagnola
- Starring: Erin Doherty; Jared Harris; Juliet Stevenson
- Cinematography: Giles Harvey
- Edited by: Derek Ryan
- Music by: Torquil Munro
- Production companies: Little Light Film Productions; Rustle Up Productions
- Distributed by: WestEnd Films; Signature Entertainment
- Release date: 24 February 2024 (DIFF)
- Running time: 90 minutes
- Country: United Kingdom
- Language: English

Reawakening is a 2024 British psychological thriller film written and directed by Virginia Gilbert. The film stars Jared Harris, Erin Doherty and Juliet Stevenson, and had its world premiere at the Dublin International Film Festival on 24 February 2024.

== Synopsis ==
A couple, John and Mary, face a dilemma after the return of their long lost daughter after a decade. They have undergone great mental anguish and guilt for ten years, after Clare, their only child, ran away from home when she was aged fourteen, with no evidence of her whereabouts ever uncovered.

When Clare suddenly returns a decade later as a 24-year old woman, they are elated. However, John starts to suspect that Clare may not be who she says she is, triggering a deep and absorbing investigation to seek the truth.

== Cast ==
- Jared Harris as John
- Erin Doherty as Clare
- Juliet Stevenson as Mary
- Niamh Cusack
- Nicholas Pinnock

== Production ==
Principal photography ended in July 2022. In August 2022 WestEnd Films picked up worldwide distribution rights.

== Release ==
The film is distributed by Signature Entertainment. It had its world premiere at the Dublin International Film Festival on 24 February 2024.
