= Erin Doherty =

British actress

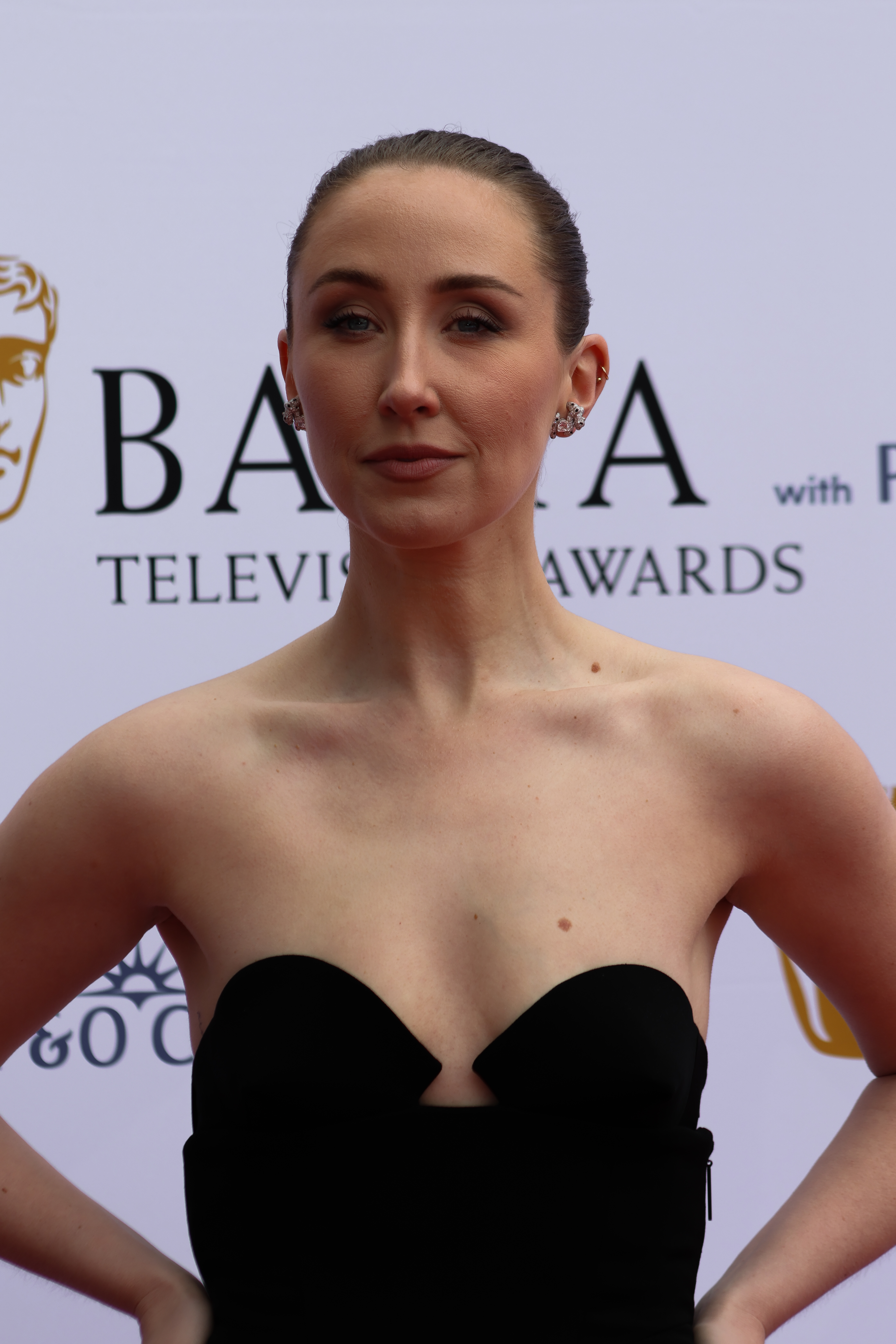
- Doherty at the 2026 BAFTA Television Awards
- Born: Erin Rachael Doherty; July 16, 1992 (age 34); Crawley, West Sussex, England
- Education: Guildford School of Acting; Bristol Old Vic Theatre School
- Occupation: Actress
- Years active: 2016–present

Erin Rachael Doherty (/ˈdoʊərti/;) is a British actress. She gained recognition as Princess Anne in the third and fourth seasons of the Netflix historical drama The Crown (2019–2020) and for her role as child psychologist Briony Ariston in Adolescence (2025), for which she won the Primetime Emmy Award for Outstanding Supporting Actress in a Limited or Anthology Series or Movie and Golden Globe Award for Best Supporting Actress – Series, Miniseries or Television Film.

== Early life and education ==
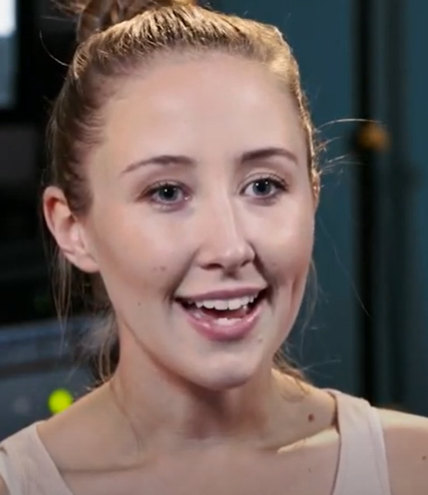
Doherty in 2020

Doherty is from Crawley in West Sussex. Her Irish paternal grandfather was from Carndonagh in County Donegal. Doherty's parents divorced when she was four. She began acting in Sunday drama classes with her older sister Grace shortly afterwards.

Doherty studied at Hazelwick School in Crawley. A talented footballer, Doherty played in midfield for and captained the Crawley Wasps and was scouted by Chelsea Women; she reached the age where she "had to commit" to either football or acting and chose the latter. Whilst at Hazelwick School, Romesh Ranganathan was Doherty's head of year.

Doherty took a one-year course at the Guildford School of Acting (2011–12) before training at the Bristol Old Vic Theatre School (2012–15).

Whilst training, Doherty won the Stephen Sondheim Society Student Performer of the Year Award in 2015 for her rendition of the song "Broadway Baby" from the Sondheim musical Follies.

== Career ==
=== Theatre ===
Doherty is a frequent theatre actress. Since graduating from Bristol Old Vic Theatre School in 2015, she has appeared in a number of productions at some of London's leading theatres. Doherty's performances have consistently attracted positive reviews from leading theatre critics. Michael Billington named Doherty as 'one of the year's greatest discoveries' after her performance in My Name Is Rachel Corrie, a one-woman play about the activist Rachel Corrie. Doherty starred in Jack Thorne's play Junkyard, which led What's On Stage reviewer Kris Hallett to write "Doherty is the star here, and by rights will soon be a star full-stop". Her leading performance in Alan Ayckbourn's play The Divide at the Old Vic Theatre was described by Dominic Cavendish for The Daily Telegraph as having "star-wattage as bright as anything".

As of 2025, she was in Unicorn, written by Mike Bartlett and directed by James Macdonald, at the Garrick Theatre. Her co-stars are Nicola Walker and Stephen Mangan.

=== Film and television ===
Doherty's first television appearance was in a 2016 episode of Call the Midwife, followed by a role in the 2018 BBC miniseries Les Misérables.

In 2018, Doherty was a Screen International Star of Tomorrow, and an Evening Standard Rising Star.

In 2019, Doherty appeared as Princess Anne in the third season of The Crown. She knew little about the princess before being cast, and consequently spent hours studying Anne's family history and life. Doherty made a point of watching footage of the princess only at the age she was portraying her, rather than interviews of Anne in later life. Anne's voice is very different from Doherty's, being much lower in pitch; the actress spent time carefully learning and mimicking it, finding that it "was the key into her psyche". Doherty reprised her role as Princess Anne in the fourth season of the series.

In 2022, Doherty was the protagonist in the BBC/Amazon Prime drama Chloe alongside Poppy Gilbert as Becky. She was also cast to portray Anne Askew in the historical drama film Firebrand in 2023. In 2024, she played Clare, a missing child returning to her parents at age 24, in the British psychological thriller film Reawakening, alongside Jared Harris and Juliet Stevenson.

In 2025, she played child psychologist Briony Ariston, alongside the youth Owen Cooper, in episode 3 of the Netflix miniseries Adolescence. This received media coverage due to the intense 52-minute episode having been filmed entirely in a single uncut take (as was each episode of the series). Lucy Mangan of The Guardian ranked the third episode of the miniseries' as "most astounding", declaring that Doherty was "surely emerging as one of the best actors of her generation".

The same year, Doherty continued working with Stephen Graham. She played Mary Carr in Disney+'s A Thousand Blows (2025), as the leader of an all-female crime syndicate called the Forty Elephants.

== Personal life ==
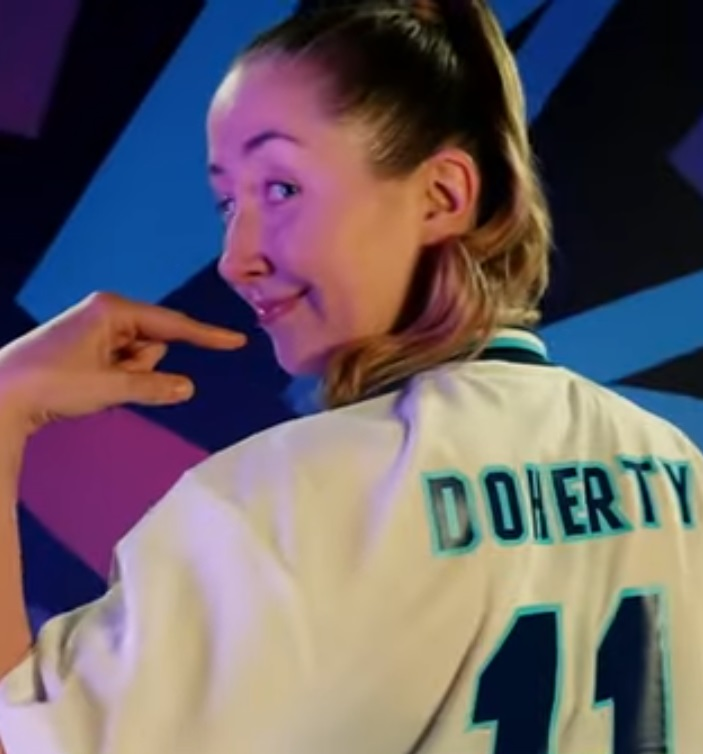
Erin Doherty Soccer Aid for UNICEF UK 2024

Doherty is a lesbian and was in a relationship with fellow actress Sophie Melville. She later dated radiographer Sinead Donnelly.

In 2024, Doherty was one of the celebrities chosen to play football for England against the World XI in the charity event Soccer Aid for UNICEF; England won 6–3. She is a football fan and supports Tottenham Hotspur F.C.

== Acting credits ==
=== Film ===
Year	Title	Role	Notes
2023	Firebrand	Anne Askew	
2024	Reawakening	Clare	
2026	Faith	Gina	
2027	Paris Paramount	TBA	Filming

=== Television ===
Year	Title	Role	Network	Notes
2017	Call the Midwife	Jessie Marsh	BBC	Episode 6.2
2018	Les Misérables	Fabienne	BBC	Episodes 1.2, 1.3 (uncredited)
2020	Unprecedented	Dee	BBC Four	Episode 1.5
2019–2020	The Crown	Anne, Princess Royal	Netflix	Main role (Seasons 3–4); 15 episodes
2022	Chloe	Becky	BBC and Amazon Prime Video	6 episodes, main role
2025	Adolescence	Briony Ariston	Netflix	Episode 3 - Main role
2025–2026	A Thousand Blows	Mary Carr	Disney+	12 episodes, main role
TBA	California Avenue	Lela	BBC One	Main role

=== Theatre ===
Year	Title	Role	Venue	Notes
2017	Junkyard	Fiz	Bristol Old Vic	
2017	My Name Is Rachel Corrie	Rachel Corrie	Young Vic	
2017	A Christmas Carol	Belle	The Old Vic	
2018	The Divide	Soween	The Old Vic	
2019	Wolfie	Z	Theatre503	
2022	The Crucible	Abigail Williams	Olivier Theatre, Royal National Theatre	
2024	Death of England: Closing Time	Carly	@sohoplace	
2025	Unicorn	Kate	Garrick Theatre	

== Awards and nominations ==
Year	Award	Category	Nominated work	Company/Theatre	Result	Ref.
2015	Stephen Sondheim Society	Student Performer of the Year Award	Follies	Garrick Theatre	Won	
2017	BroadwayWorld UK Awards	Best Actress in a New Production of a Musical	Junkyard	Bristol Old Vic	Nominated	
2017	Manchester Theatre Awards	Best Actress in a Studio Production	Wish List	Royal Exchange Studio	Won	
2019	Screen Actors Guild Awards	Outstanding Ensemble in a Drama Series	The Crown	Netflix	Won	
2020	Screen Actors Guild Awards	Outstanding Ensemble in a Drama Series	The Crown	Netflix	Won	
2020	Newport Film Festival	Breakthrough Artist Award	The Crown	Netflix	Won	
2022	Diva Awards	Actor of the Year	Chloe	BBC	Nominated	
2025	Gotham TV Awards	Outstanding Supporting Performance in a Limited Series	Adolescence	Netflix	Nominated	
2025	Astra TV Awards	Best Supporting Actress in a Limited Series or Streaming Movie	Adolescence	Netflix	Nominated	
2025	Primetime Emmy Awards	Outstanding Supporting Actress in a Limited or Anthology Series or Movie	Adolescence	Netflix	Won	
2026	Critics Choice Television Awards	Best Supporting Actress in a Limited Series or Movie Made For Television	Adolescence	Netflix	Won	
2026	Golden Globe Awards	Best Performance by a Female Actor in a Supporting Role on Television	Adolescence	Netflix	Won	
2026	Actor Awards	Outstanding Performance by a Female Actor in a Miniseries or Television Movie	Adolescence	Netflix	Nominated	
2026	British Academy Television Awards	Best Supporting Actress	Adolescence	Netflix	Nominated	
2026	British Academy Television Awards	Best Actress	A Thousand Blows	Disney+	Nominated	

== See also ==
- List of British actors
