= Fflur Dafydd =

Welsh novelist and musician, born 1978

- Born: 1 August 1978 (age 48)
- Genres: Blues; soul; pop
- Occupations: Musician; novelist; poet; screen writer
- Instrument: Singer
- Writing career
- Education: B.A. Aberystwyth; M.A. East Anglia (2000); PhD Bangor (2001)
- Language: Welsh; English
- Period: Contemporary

Fflur Dafydd (born 1 August 1978) is a Welsh novelist, screenwriter, singer-songwriter and musician. Though mainly publishing in Welsh, she also writes in English. She contributes regularly in Welsh to Radio Cymru.

== Early life ==
Dafydd is the daughter of Welsh poet Menna Elfyn and a cousin of BBC broadcaster Bethan Elfyn. She grew up in Llandysul, a Welsh-speaking community, and although she received the majority of her education in Welsh, she chose to study English in higher education. She graduated in English from Aberystwyth University. While she was there she first came to prominence as a student in 1999, by winning the Literature Medal at the Urdd National Eisteddfod at Lampeter. This success led to the publication of Y Gwir Am Gelwydd (The Truth About Lies), a collection of 12 poems and five short stories.

After graduating from Aberystwyth, she gained an MA in creative writing from the University of East Anglia in 2000, followed by a PhD on the poetry of R. S. Thomas from Bangor University in 2001.

== Writer ==
Dafydd has written for stage, screen and radio, and her wide repertoire includes short fiction, journalism, lecturing, songwriting, screenwriting, poetry, novels, plays and films.

She was nominated for a D.M. Davies award at the Cardiff International Film Festival for her short film "Bathtime" (2002).

In 2005 her first novel Lliwiau Liw Nos (Colours by Night) was published and shortlisted for the Prose Medal. It was followed in 2006 by her second novel Atyniad (Attraction), which won the Prose Medal at the National Eisteddfod in Swansea.

In 2005 she was selected for the Scritture Giovani project for emerging European writers. She has also undertaken literary residencies in Helsinki (2006) and on Bardsey Island (2002).

In 2008 she published her first English-language novel, Twenty Thousand Saints, inspired by six weeks as a writer-in-residence on Bardsey in 2002. On her choice of language, she said, "It started out as a translation of a Welsh-language novel, and after about a year or so, I decided that it really wasn't working – so I decided to start from scratch with a completely different story." This work won for her the Oxfam Hay Emerging Writer Award.

In 2009 she won the Daniel Owen Memorial Prize for her novel Y Llyfrgell (The Library). In the same year, she took part in the International Writing Program at the University of Iowa. The novel was adapted by Dafydd herself into a 2016 film, directed by Euros Lyn. The film won a BAFTA Cymru award, and Dafydd was nominated for a BIFA award for debut screenwriter. She has also written around 50 hours of primetime drama for S4C and the BBC Iplayer. Her original shows "PARCH" and "YR AMGUEDDFA" were nominated for numerous awards at BAFTA Cymru, and were distributed internationally in Spain, Japan and the US, and her shows "35 awr" (35 hours) and "35 Diwrnod" (35 Days) also sold to Britbox in the US and Canada. As well as writing in Welsh for S4C she has also contributed episodes to Humans (China version) and Trigger Point (ITV Season 3.) Her first radio drama series for BBC Radio 4, Mothercover, was nominated for Best Audio Drama in the BBC Audio Drama awards 2026.

Her most recent novels - The Library Suicides (2022) and The House of Water (2025) are published by Hodder & Stoughton and The House of Water was longlisted for the Crime Association's Twisted Dagger Award 2026.

=== Bibliography ===
Fiction

- "The White Trail" (Seren, 2011)
- "Awr y Locustiaid" ("The Hour of the Locusts") (Y Lolfa, 2010)
- "Twenty Thousands Saints" (Alcemi, 2008)
- "Atyniad" (Attraction) (Y Lolfa, 2006)
- "Lliwiau Liw Nos" (Evening Colours) (Y Lolfa, 2005)
- "Elsewhere" (Scritture Giovani, 2005)
- "Ffordd o Fyw" (A Way of Living) not yet published
- "Heb Glustiau" (Without Ears) not yet published

Scripts

- Parch (Rev) (2015-2018), TV drama series on S4C
- Y Llyfrgell (The Library Murders) (2016), feature film
- Diwrnod Dwynwen (Dwynwen's Day) (2003), written with others
- Helfa Drysor (Treasure Hunt), (2006)
- Brewys (unpublished play, performed at Chapter Arts, 2005)
- Hugo (Sgript Cymru, 2003)

Poetry

- "Fruit" (New Welsh Review, 2004)
- "Enlli" (Tu Chwith, 2003)

Short Films & Animation

- "Women of Mumbles Head" (Screen Gems, 2005)
- "Martha Melys Gacwn a Capten Pigfain" (Cwmni Da, S4C, 2004)
- "Clic" (Opus, S4C, 2003)
- "Bathtime" (Cyfle & Sgrin 2002)

Articles

- "Welsh Icons" (2007)
- "This is I; there is nothing else": a comparative study of R.S. Thomas and Hugh MacDiarmid, Welsh Writing in English Yearbook (2006)

== Musician ==
Dafydd described her sound as "a fusion of blues, soul and pop".

She has released five albums to date:

- Pethau Rhyfedd (Strange Things) (2003) – released when she was part of the girl band Y Panics; she emerged as a solo artist in 2005, although she is supported by her regular band, Y Barf (The Beard), who, along with Dafydd on guitar and piano, comprised core members Rhys 'Y Barf' James (guitar), Iestyn Jones (bass), Jon Bradford Jones (drums) and Iwan 'Llangain' Evans (keyboard & sax).
- Coch am Weddill fy Oes (Red for the Rest of my Days) (2005) – her first release as a solo artist, it was recorded at the Millennium Centre in Cardiff
- Un Ffordd Mas (One Way Out) (2007) – her second solo album, under the name of Fflur Dafydd a'r Barf
- Byd Bach (Small World) (2009) – also released by Fflur Dafydd a'r Barf
- Ffydd Gobaith Cariad (Faith Hope Love) (2012) – made no mention of Y Barf, although several of the musicians appearing on the album were members of the band

As a singer-songwriter Dafydd has performed in many countries, and has been performing regularly in literary and music festivals and events throughout Wales, including larger events such as the National Eisteddfod and the Faenol Festival.

=== Discography ===
==== Albums ====
Pethau Rhyfedd

1. "Annioddefol"
2. "Dyn Tywydd"
3. "Leicra Lan Lofft"
4. "Pethau Rhyfedd"
5. "Pobl Chips/Cân Gwenllian"

Coch am weddill fy oes

1. "Leni"
2. "Wardrob Gefn"
3. "Ar ôl Heddi’"
4. "Deall i'r Dim"
5. "Mr Freestyle"
6. "Byth Mynd i Newid"
7. "Tu ôl i'r Gwair"
8. "Sgidie Rhad"
9. "Y Gwir am Gelwydd"
10. "'93"

Un Ffordd Mas

1. "'Sa Fan 'Na"
2. "Dala Fe Nôl"
3. "Mr Bogota"
4. "Y Gân Go Iawn"
5. "Pan Oeddwn Fachgen"
6. "Cocladwdldw"
7. "Doeth"
8. "Wedi Mynd"
9. "Helsinki"
10. "Y Drwg"
11. "Tan yr Angladd"
12. "Un Ffordd Mas"

Byd Bach

1. "Pobol Bach"
2. "A47 Dim"
3. "Caerdydd"
4. "Penrhiwllan"
5. "Aberaeron"
6. "Byd Bach"
7. "Porthgain"
8. "Y Llywbrau"
9. "Abercuawg"
10. "Yr Ymylon"

Ffydd Gobaith Cariad

1. "Rhoces"
2. "Ffydd Gobaith Cariad"
3. "Ray o'r Mynydd"
4. "Y ferch sy'n licio'r gaeaf"
5. "Martha Llwyd"
6. "Frank a Moira"
7. "Y Porffor Hwn"
8. "Brawd Bach"
9. "Elfyn"
10. "Rachel Myra"

==== Singles/EPs ====
Dala Fe Nôl

1. "Dala Fe Nôl"
2. "Doeth"
3. "Dala Fe Nôl (edit)"

Helsinki

1. "Helsinki"
2. "Y Drwg"

Caerdydd / Porthgain

1. "Caerdydd"
2. "Porthgain"
