= David Thacker =

British theatre and television director (born 1950)

David Thacker (born 21 December 1950) is an English theatre, film and television director. He is Professor of Theatre and Film at the University of Greater Manchester.

He directs freelance theatre productions and films and teaches and directs at other universities and drama schools, including the University of York, University of Manchester, Drama Studio London and London Academy of Music and Dramatic Art.

== Spouse ==
He is married to the actress Margot Leicester. They have four children and four grandchildren and live in Crouch End, London.

== Education ==
Thacker was born in Higham Ferrers, Northamptonshire and brought up in nearby Rushden. He was educated at Wellingborough Grammar School and the University of York, where he read English and Related Literature and studied under Philip Brockbank for an MA in Shakespeare.

== Theatre ==
Thacker has directed over 160 productions throughout the UK and internationally and has been artistic director of three theatres (Duke’s Playhouse Lancaster, the Young Vic and Octagon Theatre, Bolton); and Director-in-Residence at the Royal Shakespeare Company.

He has directed over 160 theatre productions throughout the UK and internationally, including plays by Edward Albee, Alan Ayckbourn, Samuel Beckett, Alan Bennett, Christopher Marlowe, Arthur Miller, Eugene O'Neill, Joe Orton, Harold Pinter, Stephen Poliakoff, Peter Shaffer, Terence Rattigan, Ron Rose, Willy Russell, William Shakespeare, Les Smith, Tom Stoppard, Oscar Wilde and Tennessee Williams.

He has directed 30 productions of 15 of Shakespeare's plays including Macbeth (Theatre Royal York); Julius Caesar (Lyceum Theatre Crewe); Romeo and Juliet, Measure for Measure, Hamlet (Duke's Playhouse Lancaster); Othello, Macbeth, Measure for Measure, Hamlet, A Midsummer Night's Dream, Julius Caesar, The Winter's Tale (the Young Vic); Pericles, The Merchant of Venice, Julius Caesar, Coriolanus, The Tempest (Royal Shakespeare Company) ; A Midsummer Night's Dream, Romeo and Juliet, Macbeth, Twelfth Night, The Winter's Tale, Hamlet (Octagon Theatre Bolton); and The Merchant of Venice, (The Great Theatre of China, in association with the RSC).

He directed the British premiere of Arthur Miller's Broken Glass and Death of a Salesman at the National Theatre and has directed more productions of Arthur Miller’s plays than any other director in the world – 11 of his plays in 15 productions at the Young Vic, the National Theatre, the Octagon Theatre: and in the USA, Israel, for the BBC and BBC World Service.

Seven of his productions have transferred to the West End: Henrik Ibsen's Ghosts (with Vanessa Redgrave, Tom Wilkinson and Adrian Dunbar), Eugene O'Neill’s A Touch of the Poet (with Vanessa Redgrave and Timothy Dalton), Arthur Miller's version of Ibsen's An Enemy of the People (with Tom Wilkinson, Margot Leicester, Suzan Sylvester, Clive Swift, and Tom Mannion), his RSC production of Shakespeare's The Two Gentlemen of Verona, Arthur Miller's A View from the Bridge (with Bernard Hill, Charlotte Cornwell, and Joe Fiennes), Arthur Miller's The Last Yankee (with Margot Leicester and Matthew Marsh) and Arthur Miller's Broken Glass (with Henry Goodman, Margot Leicester and Ken Stott).

Thacker's first major appointment in theatre was as Artistic Director of the Duke’s Playhouse, Lancaster in 1980 – at the time, the youngest artistic director in the country.

He was appointed as Director of the Young Vic in 1984. He left the Young Vic to join the Royal Shakespeare Company (1993–95) as Director-in-Residence and from 1996 continued to direct for the RSC, directing nine productions in all.

After ten years of freelancing in theatre, film and television, in 2007 Liverpool John Moores University, Knowsley Metropolitan Borough Council and Northern Shakespeare Trust appointed Thacker as Director of Shakespeare North - the visionary and strategic leader to establish a new theatre in Prescot, Merseyside where the UK’s first purpose-built indoor theatre was built in the 1590s. Out of over 100 contestants in Living Landmarks, a National Lottery competition, Shakespeare North reached the final shortlist of six proposals. He stepped down as Director of Shakespeare North upon his appointment as Artistic Director of the Octagon. Shakespeare North Playhouse opened in September 2022 and in November 2022 became an Arts Council National Portfolio Organisation.

He was Artistic Director at the Octagon Theatre Bolton for six years from 2009 until 2015. A prolific director at the Octagon (he directed 36 productions there), during his tenure as Artistic Director the theatre enhanced its regional and national reputation. The Octagon presented 52 main auditorium productions over that period, more than any other regional theatre in the country.

As Artistic Director of the Octagon he was also Visiting Professor at University of Bolton - lecturing, teaching, and giving students access to the work of the Octagon. In 2014/15, Thacker and Octagon colleagues collaborated with staff at University of Bolton to create an innovative Theatre BA which mirrored the activities of the Octagon Theatre, one of the UK’s few exclusively producing theatres. In July 2015 he stepped down as Artistic Director to become the first Professor of Theatre at the University of Bolton, leading the development of the new Theatre BA and taking on the newly created post of Associate Artistic Director at the Octagon. He continued in this role until 2019 directing two Octagon productions a year.

=== Awards ===
His RSC production of Pericles received two Olivier Awards (Best Director and Best Revival). He received Olivier nominations for his Young Vic/West End productions of Ghosts and An Enemy of the People. He has received London Fringe Awards: Best Director (Ghosts) and Best Production (Who’s Afraid of Virginia Woolf?). His 2010 production of The Hired Man won the TMA Award for Best Performance in a Musical (The Ensemble). He received a Theatre Writers’ Guild New Writing Encouragement Award in 2010.

At the 2016 Manchester Theatre Awards, Thacker’s productions received six awards including all the major acting awards and Best Production (An Enemy of the People) – the only time that any director achieved this in the history of the Awards. He also received a personal achievement award for his outstanding achievements as Artistic Director of the Octagon. He had previously received Manchester Evening News Awards for Best Studio Production (The Enemies Within) and Best Production (The Price). In 2014 he was awarded an Honorary Doctorate at University of Bolton for his services to theatre.

== Film and television ==
In 1992 Thacker directed his first TV drama, Ibsen's A Doll's House for BBC which was nominated for a BAFTA (Best single drama). The success of this led to more TV dramas including Arthur Miller's Death of a Salesman and his BBC modern dress film of Shakespeare's Measure for Measure, which was selected for the International TV Festival in Guatemala in 1996. For ten years (1997–2007), he combined freelance theatre productions, television films and dramas – directing more than 30 TV films for the BBC, ITV, Channel 4 and WGBH Boston (USA).

These included episodes of Waking the Dead, Kavanagh QC; Silent Witness, Foyle’s War, Grafters, The Vice, Dalziel and Pascoe, Murder in Mind, Blue Dove, London Bridge, and his films, Faith (set in the 1984–85 Miners' Strike), The Scold’s Bridle, and The Mayor of Casterbridge.

=== Current work ===
Thacker's current role as Professor of Theatre and Film enables him to direct freelance theatre productions and films. In October 2019 Thacker directed The Merchant of Venice at the Great Theatre of China for Shanghai Theatre Academy and Fortune All Asia Pacific Entertainment (Shanghai) Company, in association with the Royal Shakespeare Company.

In Spring 2019 Thacker directed the northern premiere of Arthur Miller’s, The Last Yankee, and in Spring 2020 directed Samuel Beckett’s Happy Days, for his new professional company, at Bolton Library Theatre, a theatre he created for Bolton Library and Museum Services, to provide a catalyst for learning for students on the BA Theatre Programme.

During the COVID 19 pandemic, he completed an extensive innovative film project for University of Bolton – The Alternative Graduation. This involved designing the only Covid-secure in-person graduation ceremony in the UK and directing 14 feature-length graduation documentary films for the benefit of graduates, their friends, and families.

=== FORM AND PRESSURE ===
In 2024 Thacker set up FORM AND PRESSURE to develop collaborations with fringe theatres and to promote training, education and film projects. FORM AND PRESSURE has now presented three critically acclaimed co-productions with Rising Moon Productions at The Kings Arms, Salford - directed by Thacker; David Mamet's American Buffalo, Brian Friel's Faith Healer and 'That Can't Have Happened!', a verbatim play, created from transcripts of conversations Thacker had with five survivors of domestic abuse at the women's refuge in Bolton, Fortalice. He is currently adapting Dickens' A Christmas Carol, for FORM AND PRESSURE's fourth co-productions with Rising Moon Production in December 2025.

FORM AND PRESSURE is developing a feature film, co-written with Phil Vasili, based on the life of the first black outfield football player and WW1 hero, Walter Tull (1888–1918)
