= Maffey =

Maffey is an English-language surname. Notable people with the surname include:

- Alan Maffey, 2nd Baron Rugby (1913–1990), English peer
- Denis Maffey (1922–1995), English footballer
- John Maffey, 1st Baron Rugby (1877–1969), English civil servant and diplomat
- John Maffey (MP) (fl. 1414, English politician
- Penelope Loader Maffey (1910–2005), English socialite

== See also ==
- Maffei (surname)
- Maffeis
