= Baron Rugby =

Barony in the Peerage of the United Kingdom

Baron Rugby, of Rugby in the County of Warwick, is a title in the Peerage of the United Kingdom. It was created in 1947 for the civil servant Sir John Maffey. He was Governor-General of the Sudan between 1926 and 1933 and Permanent Under-Secretary of State for the Colonies between 1933 and 1937. At Winston Churchill's request he became the first United Kingdom representative to Ireland in 1939, a post he held throughout the war years and until his retirement in 1949. The title is now held by his grandson, the third Baron, who succeeded his father in 1990.

The Hon. Penelope Aitken, mother of the former Conservative politician Jonathan Aitken and of the actress Maria Aitken, was the daughter of the first Baron Rugby.

== Barons Rugby (1947) ==
- John Loader Maffey, 1st Baron Rugby (1877–1969)
- Alan Loader Maffey, 2nd Baron Rugby (1913–1990)
- Robert Charles Maffey, 3rd Baron Rugby (b. 1951)

The heir apparent to the barony is the 3rd Baron's eldest son, the Hon. Timothy James Howard Maffey (born 1975).

== Arms ==
Coat of arms of Baron Rugby
Crest A gauntlet fessewise grasping a lantern Proper. Escutcheon Ermine a fort with two towers Proper issuant from the base a pile reversed Sable a chief dancettée Or surmounted by a pile Azure charged with an increscent Argent. Supporters On either side an Afghan hound Proper gorged with a collar the chain reflexed over the back Or. Motto Pass Friend
