= Maffeis =

Maffeis is an Italian surname derived from the given name Maffeo (an archaic form for 'Matthew'). Notable people with the surname include:

- Agnese Maffeis (born 1965), Italian discus thrower and shot putter
- Angela Maffeis (born 1996), Italian cyclist
- Ivan Maffeis (born 1963), Italian Roman Catholic prelate

== See also ==
- Maffei (surname)
- Maffey
