= Elizabeth Harris Aitken =

Welsh socialite (1936–2022)

The Honourable Elizabeth Harris Aitken
- Born: Elizabeth Rees-Williams; 1 May 1936; Glamorgan, Wales
- Died: 15 April 2022 (aged 85); London, England
- Spouses: Richard Harris (m. 1957; div. 1969); Rex Harrison (m. 1971; div. 1975); Peter Aitken (198?; divorced); Jonathan Aitken (m. 2003)
- Children: Damian Harris; Jared Harris; Jamie Harris
- Father: David Rees-Williams, 1st Baron Ogmore

Elizabeth Harris Aitken (née Rees-Williams; 1 May 1936 – 15 April 2022) was a Welsh socialite known for her public marriages to Richard Harris, Rex Harrison, and Jonathan Aitken. She was also the mother of actors Jared Harris and Jamie Harris, and filmmaker Damian Harris.

== Early life and education ==
Aitken was born Elizabeth Rees-Williams in Glamorgan, Wales on 1 May 1936, the daughter of David Rees-Williams, Labour Member of Parliament for Croydon. In 1950, her father was named the first Baron Ogmore. Aitken attended a convent school in Switzerland and was presented as a debutante to the Court of Queen Elizabeth II in 1954.

Aitken attended the Royal Academy of Dramatic Art in London, but was reportedly told by the school's principal that she did not have a future in acting.

== Career ==
Aitken published her memoir, Love, Honour and Dismay, in 1976 under the surname Harrison. She dedicated the book "to RH," initials shared by her first two husbands, Richard Harris and Rex Harrison.

== Personal life ==
In 1957, Aitken married Irish actor Richard Harris, with whom she had three sons: actors Jared Harris and Jamie Harris, and filmmaker Damian Harris. After divorcing Harris, Aitken married English actor Rex Harrison in 1971. It was Harrison's fifth marriage.

During the 1970s, Aitken reportedly had a relationship with Conservative politician Jonathan Aitken. In the 1980s, she married Jonathan's cousin Peter Aitken, a Canadian investment banker.

She became reacquainted with Jonathan Aitken in 2001, when her son Jamie appeared in an acting project Jonathan's nephew, Jack Davenport. In 2003, the couple married at St Matthew's Church, Westminster.

At the age of 77, Aitken suffered a brain haemorrhage that nearly killed her. She died at the Chelsea and Westminster Hospital on 15 April 2022, at the age of 85.
