= Jamie Harris (actor) =

British actor

- Born: Tudor St. John Harris; 15 May 1963 (age 63); Whitechapel, London, England
- Education: Downside School, Somerset, England
- Occupation: Actor
- Years active: 1993–present
- Parents: Richard Harris; Elizabeth Rees-Williams
- Relatives: Damian Harris (brother); Jared Harris (brother); David Rees-Williams (grandfather); Annabelle Wallis (first cousin once removed)

Tudor St. John "Jamie" Harris (born 15 May 1963) is a British actor. He is best known for his role as The Hook-Handed Man in Lemony Snicket's A Series of Unfortunate Events (2004), Rodney in Rise of the Planet of the Apes (2011), and Gordon in Marvel's Agents of S.H.I.E.L.D. (2014–2015).

== Early life ==
Harris was born on 15 May 1963, in Whitechapel, London as Tudor St. John Harris and is the third and youngest of three boys to Irish actor Richard Harris and Welsh socialite Elizabeth Rees-Williams. His older brothers are director Damian Harris and actor Jared Harris.

== Education ==
Harris was educated at Ladycross, a former preparatory boarding independent school in the coastal town of Seaford in East Sussex, as were his brothers Jared and Damian, followed by Downside School, a Catholic boarding independent school in the village of Stratton-on-the-Fosse (near the market town of Shepton Mallet) in Somerset, in South West England.

== Filmography ==
=== Films ===
Year	Title	Role	Notes
1993	In the Name of the Father	Deptford Jim	
1994	Princess Caraboo	Tom	
1995	Savage Hearts	Johnny	
1997	Touch Me	"Link"	
1997	Marie from the Bay of Angels	Jimmy	
1998	Suicide, the Comedy	Matt Hirsch	
1999	The Lost Son	Hopper	
1999	Made Men	Royce	
2000	Fast Food Fast Women	Bruno	
2000	Dinner Rush	Sean the Bartender	
2001	Made	"Rogue"	
2001	The Next Big Thing	Deech Scumble	
2001	Subterrain	Seamus	
2002	Nancy & Frank – A Manhattan Love Story	Anatoly Makarov	
2003	Rick	Mick	
2004	Lemony Snicket's A Series of Unfortunate Events	The Hook-Handed Man	
2005	The New World	Emery	
2006	Flannel Pajamas	Brad	
2006	508 Nelson	Terry Nemov	
2006	The Killing of John Lennon	Gay Man	
2006	The Prestige	Sullen Warder	
2007	I Believe in America	Reynaldo	
2008	The Kreutzer Sonata	Charles	
2009	Crank: High Voltage	Talk Show Host	
2009	Night of the Demons	Nigel	
2009	Knife Edge	Derek	
2010	Mr. Nice	Patrick Lane	
2011	The Green Hornet	Popeye	
2011	Rise of the Planet of the Apes	Rodney - Shelter Assistant	
2011	God Bless America	American Superstarz Judge	
2011	Lost Revolution	Reynaldo	
2012	Two Jacks	Colin	
2014	Blood Ransom	Bill	
2015	Knight of Cups	Burglar	
2015	The Frontier	Flynn	
2017	The Jade Pendant	Robert Thompson	
2019	Lost Transmissions	Angus	
2021	West Side Story	Rory	
2023	Brave the Dark	Barney	
2026	The Odyssey	Agelaus	

=== Television ===
Year	Title	Role	Notes
1996	Highlander: The Series	Daniel Geiger	Episode: "Methuselah's Gift"
1999	La Femme Nikita	Zalman	Episode: "Beyond the Pale"
2001	The Big Heist	Frankie Burke	TV film
2001	The Lost Battalion	Sergeant Gaedeke	TV film
2008	Life	Justin Tapp	Episode: "Badge Bunny"
2009	CSI: Crime Scene Investigation	Howard Velco	Episode: "Disarmed and Dangerous"
2010	No Ordinary Family	Reed Koblenz	Episode: "Pilot"
2011	The Mentalist	Marcus Lansdale	Episode: "Like a Redheaded Stepchild"
2011	White Collar	Elliott Richmond	Episode: "Countdown"
2011	American Horror Story: Murder House	R. Franklin	Episode: "Home Invasion"
2012	CSI: Miami	Eddie Coster	Episode: "Habeas Corpse"
2012	Underbelly	Viktor	Episode: "Pilot"
2013	NCIS: Los Angeles	Tommy Kraus	Episode: "Red: Part Two"
2013	Magic City	Nicky Grillo	5 episodes
2014–2015	Agents of S.H.I.E.L.D.	Gordon	Recurring
2014–2016	Turn: Washington's Spies	John Robeson	Recurring; 7 episodes
2014–2017	Kingdom	Terry	7 episodes
2017	Making History	Colonel Smith	Episode: "The Shot Heard Round the World"
2017	The Magicians	Friar Joseph	2 episodes
2017	Shameless	Eric	2 episodes
2019–2023	Carnival Row	Desk Sergeant Dombey	Recurring
2020	Lovecraft Country	Sheriff Eustace Hunt	Episode: "Sundown"
2021	Young Rock	Professor	Episode: "Check Your Head"
2022	NCIS	Smitty Hastings	Episode: "First Steps"
2024	FBI: International	Director Anton Markov	Episode: "Cowboy Behavior"

=== Video games ===
Year	Title	Role
2009	Resistance: Retribution	British Commandos (voices)
