= Brave the Dark =

2023 film by Damian Harris

- Theatrical release poster
- Directed by: Damian Harris
- Written by: Dale G. Bradley; Lynn Robertson-Hay; Nathaniel Deen; John P. Spencer; Damian Harris
- Produced by: Grant Bradley; Derek Dienner; Dale G. Bradley
- Starring: Jared Harris; Nicholas Hamilton; Jamie Harris; Sasha Bhasin; Will Edward Price; Kimberly S. Fairbanks
- Cinematography: Julio Macat
- Edited by: Toby Yates
- Music by: Jacob Yoffee; Roahn Hylton
- Production companies: Inspiring Films; MAKE/FILMS
- Distributed by: Angel Studios
- Release dates: October 6, 2023 (Heartland); January 24, 2025 (United States)
- Running time: 112 minutes
- Country: United States
- Language: English
- Budget: $200,000
- Box office: $4.5 million

Brave the Dark is a 2023 American coming-of-age drama film directed by Damian Harris and starring Jared Harris and Nicholas Hamilton. The film premiered at the Heartland International Film Festival in October 2023, and was released in the United States on January 24, 2025. It has received mixed reviews from critics.

== Premise ==
Set in 1980s rural Pennsylvania, is based on true events.

Stan Deen, a teacher in New Holland, Pennsylvania, discovers that one of his students, Nate, has been living out of his car and has been arrested. Moved by Nate's plight, Stan decides to bail him out and offers him a place to stay, aiming to help him graduate high school. As their relationship develops, Stan becomes increasingly involved in uncovering the dark secrets of Nate's past.

== Cast ==
- Jared Harris as Stan Deen, a small-town teacher in 1980s Pennsylvania
- Nicholas Hamilton as Nate, a homeless teenager living in his car
- Jamie Harris as Barney, Nate's parole officer
- Sasha Bhasin as Tina, Nate's girlfriend
- Kimberly Fairbanks as Deborah, a teacher and Stan's friend
- Will Price as Johnny, Nate's friend
- Meredith Sullivan as Gloria
- Daisy Galvis as the judge overseeing Nate's sentencing
- Joey Cabrera as Jim Baxter, Tina's Father

== Production ==
Stan Deen was a high school English and Drama teacher of the Garden Spot High School, Lancaster County, Pennsylvania from 1967 until his death in 2016. He founded the Garden Spot Performing Arts (GSPA) in 1967. Brave the Dark was written by Dale G. Bradley, Lynn Robertson, John P. Spencer, director Damian Harris and Nathaniel "Nate" Deen.

To help embody Deen fully, Harris watched every video of the teacher that Nate Deen had.

Filming locations included the real Garden Spot High School in Lancaster County where Nathaniel Deen attended and Stan Deen taught as well as the house both lived in. Filming took place between late summer and autumn 2021. Climactic scenes were filmed against the Poplar Neck Bridge near Lancaster in October 2021.

Three brothers were part of the film: Jared Harris as the star, Jamie Harris as the probation officer, and Damian Harris as director and co-writer.

== Release ==
The film was released to film festivals in 2023. In 2024, Angel Studios placed Brave the Dark before its Angel Guild, a group of investors who vote on whether the studio should distribute the film. After a successful vote, Angel Studios picked up the film for theatrical distribution. The film had its red carpet premiere at the Fulton Theatre in Lancaster on January 11, 2025.

Brave the Dark was released in theaters in the United States on January 24, 2025.

== Reception ==
=== Box office ===
In its opening weekend, the film made $2.3 million from 2,230 theaters, finishing in 12th. It ended up with $4.4 million.

=== Critical response ===
On the review aggregator website Rotten Tomatoes, 74% of 42 critics' reviews are positive, with an average rating of 5.9/10. The website's consensus reads: "Grounded by Jared Harris' dignified performance, Brave the Dark tells an inspirational true story with familiar beats but commendable integrity." Metacritic, which uses a weighted average, assigned the film a score of 56 out of 100, based on 5 critics, indicating "mixed or average" reviews. Audiences surveyed by CinemaScore gave the film an average grade of "A" on an A+ to F scale, while those polled by PostTrak gave it an 88% positive score, with 66% saying they would definitely recommend it.

Variety reviewer Joe Leydon wrote, "It takes quite a while for Nathan and Stan to begin forging a bond of mutual trust, and longer still before Nathan feels comfortable to discuss in detail how he was traumatized by witnessing the deaths of his parents. But this deliberateness works very much to the film’s advantage, as it allows Harris and Hamilton sufficient time to illuminate all the diverse facets of their characters, and generate an arresting chemistry that is sometimes humorous, sometimes acrimonious and always credible. The two actors really do bring out the best in each other, making it all the easier for us to develop a rooting interest in both characters."

ScreenRant's Ben Gibbons also praised the main characters' performances. "Brave the Dark appears to be approaching the realm of classic films like Good Will Hunting, though this independent effort does not manage to soar quite as high," he wrote. He said the pace of the film was uneven and some lines by supporting characters inartfully delivered, but that overall "Brave the Dark does deliver an engaging and enjoyable narrative, with excellent performances, an intriguing and compelling plot, and an important message worth listening to."

=== Awards and nominations ===
| Award | Date | Category | Result | Ref. |
|---|---|---|---|---|
| Heartland International Film Festival | October 6, 2023 | Overall Audience Choice Award | Won | |
| Newport Beach Film Festival | October 13, 2023 | Best US Film Audience Award | Won | |
| San Diego International Film Festival | October 26, 2023 | Narrative Competition | Nominated | |
