= Annabel Brooks =

British actress (born: 4 Jan 1958)

Annabel Joan Brooks
- Born: 4 January 1958 (age 68); Oxford, England
- Occupation: Actress
- Spouses: Damian Harris (m. 1981; div. 1990): James Dearden (m. 199?)
- Children: 3
- Website: avenueproperty.com

Annabel Joan Brooks (born 4 Jan 1958) is a British actress who has appeared in films and on television since the 1980s. She was educated at Badminton School and Columbia University, before leaving to pursue acting.

== Biography ==
In 1981, Brooks married British director Damian Harris, son of Irish actor Richard Harris. They have one child together, daughter Ella. Later the couple divorced and Brooks married English film director and screenwriter James Dearden, the son of Scottish actress Melissa Stribling and English film director Basil Dearden. They have one child together, daughter Lara.

In January 2016, Brooks founded Avenue, originally Petersham Properties, a luxury home rentals company, with her friend Gael Boglione. Brooks took over the business in 2017, with her daughter.

Brooks’ first on-screen role came in 1987 when she appeared as Eliza in Nightflyers. In 1988 she played Daisy in A Handful of Dust, a British film based on the 1934 novel of the same name by Evelyn Waugh starring James Wilby and Kristin Scott Thomas. The same year, Brooks appeared in Paris by Night written and directed by David Hare and starring Charlotte Rampling, Michael Gambon and Iain Glen.

She has since appeared in The Witches, based on the 1983 novel of the same name by Roald Dahl and Love Is the Devil: Study for a Portrait of Francis Bacon, a 1998 film produced by The British Film Institute and BBC Film. It was written and directed by John Maybury and stars Derek Jacobi, Daniel Craig and Tilda Swinton. Brooks played Henrietta Moraes in the film, a British artists' model and memoirist who was the muse and inspiration for many artists of the Soho subculture during the 1950s and 1960s, including Francis Bacon and Lucian Freud.

== Filmography ==
- The Needs of Kim Stanley (2005) – herself
- Last Run (2001) – Tina
- Sam's Game, episode "Mumma's" (2001) TV episode – Julie
- The Escort (1999) – Annie
- Plunkett & Macleane (1999) – Widow with Garter
- Love Is the Devil: Study for a Portrait of Francis Bacon (1998) – Henrietta Moraes
- Princess Caraboo (1994) – Lady Neville
- The Witches (1990) – Nicola Cuttle
- Dealers (1989) – Lucy
- Paris by Night (1988) – Girl at Gillvray's Office
- A Handful of Dust (1988) – Daisy
- Cherry 2000 (1987) – Glu Glu Club Patron
- Nightflyers (1987) – Eliza
