= William Aitken (politician) =

Canadian-born British journalist and politician (1903-1964)

Sir William Aitken KBE

Member of Parliament for Bury St Edmunds
- In office 23 February 1950 – 19 January 1964
- Preceded by: Geoffrey Clifton-Brown
- Succeeded by: Eldon Griffiths

Personal details
- Born: 10 June 1903 Toronto, Ontario, Canada
- Died: 19 January 1964 (aged 60) London, England
- Party: Conservative
- Spouse: Penelope Loader Maffey (m. 1938)
- Children: Jonathan; Maria
- Education: University of Toronto
- Profession: Journalist, politician

Sir William Traven Aitken, KBE (10 June 1903 – 19 January 1964) was a Canadian-British journalist and politician who was an MP in the UK parliament for 14 years. He was a nephew of Lord Beaverbrook.

== Early life and family ==
Aitken was born on 10 June 1903, the son of Joseph Mauns Aitken of Toronto. He was educated at Upper Canada College, the oldest independent school in Canada, and went on to the University of Toronto, where he was a member of the Kappa Alpha Society. In the late 1920s he travelled through Canada and the United States, before settling in England in 1930. In 1938 he married Penelope Loader Maffey, daughter of Sir John Maffey (later Lord Rugby, and a leading civil servant); they had one son, Jonathan Aitken, and one daughter, Maria Aitken.

== Wartime service ==
He found a living as a financial journalist on the staff of the Evening Standard. When the Second World War broke out, Aitken joined the Royal Air Force and piloted fighter reconnaissance aircraft; he was severely injured in 1945 and invalided out. His son Jonathan Aitken, later a politician, was born in 1942, and his daughter Maria Aitken, later an actress, was born in 1945. Penelope Aitken became a leading socialite in post-war society. His grandson, Jack Davenport, became an actor. Alexandra Aitken is the granddaughter of Sir William.

== Career ==
At the 1945 general election, Aitken was the Conservative Party candidate who attempted to recapture West Derbyshire; he lost by only 156 votes. He became instead Manager of London Express News and Feature Services while he searched for another Parliamentary nomination. He was also a director of Shop Investments Ltd and Western Ground Rents Ltd, both of which were property investment companies.

=== Parliament ===
In 1948, Aitken was adopted as Conservative candidate for Bury St Edmunds in Suffolk, in succession to Geoffrey Clifton-Brown who was standing down. At the 1950 general election, Aitken was elected by 4,129 votes. In Parliament, Aitken showed a particular interest in Commonwealth issues, and was elected vice-chairman of the Conservative Commonwealth Affairs Committee. In 1951 he called for reform of the House of Lords so that it included representatives of the Colonies, Dominions and states of the Commonwealth.

Aitken was a rare speaker, choosing to intervene only in those debates where he had a particular knowledge. He remained a backbencher although he was a member of the round-table conference on the constitution of Malta in 1955. His support for the Commonwealth made him distrust attempts to have the United Kingdom sign the Treaty of Rome. His most famous action in Parliament was to introduce his Private Member's Bill of 1961, the Highways (Miscellaneous Provisions) Bill, which gave local authorities more powers to remove obstructions to roads and to acquire land to build straight roads.

In 1960 Aitken voted to support a Labour amendment to the Betting Levy Board to reduce the Jockey Club's members of the Horserace Betting Levy Board to one, on the grounds that there should also be a veterinary surgeon on the board. In 1962, Aitken was given the honour of moving the 'loyal address' after the Queen's Speech. He was made a Knight Commander of the Order of the British Empire in the Queen's Birthday Honours of 1963.

== Death ==
He died suddenly in January 1964 aged 60. He is buried in the churchyard of St. Mary's, Playford, Suffolk.

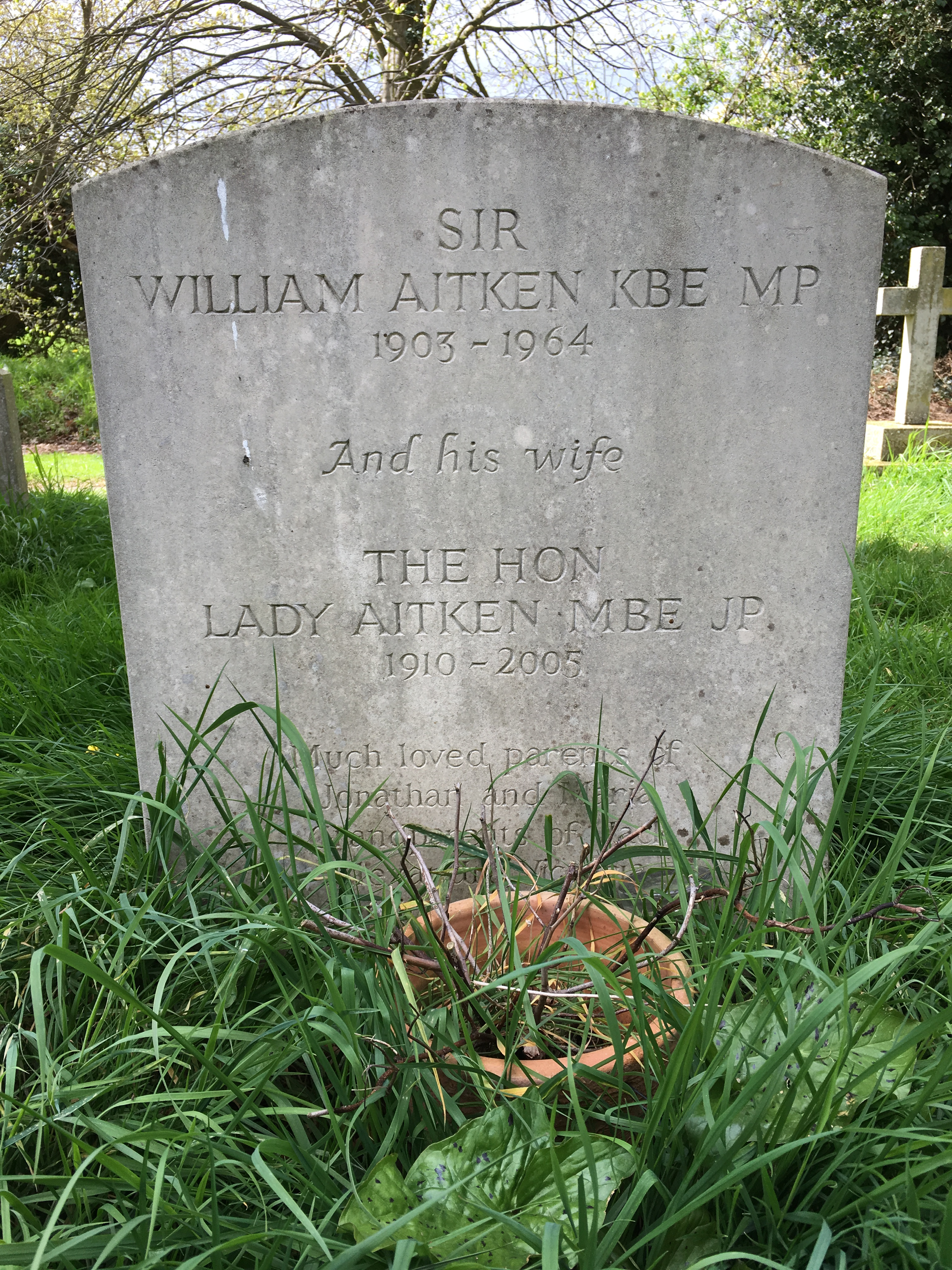
The grave of Sir William and his wife Penelope in the churchyard of St Mary, Playford

Parliament of the United Kingdom
Preceded by Geoffrey Clifton-Brown	Member of Parliament for Bury St Edmunds; 1950–1964	Succeeded by Eldon Griffiths
