= Jonathan Aitken =

British politician (born 1942)

The Reverend Jonathan Aitken

Chief Secretary to the Treasury
- In office 20 July 1994 – 5 July 1995
- Prime Minister: John Major
- Chancellor: Kenneth Clarke
- Preceded by: Michael Portillo
- Succeeded by: William Waldegrave

Minister of State for Defence Procurement
- In office 14 April 1992 – 20 July 1994
- Prime Minister: John Major
- Preceded by: Alan Clark
- Succeeded by: Roger Freeman

Member of Parliament
- In office 28 February 1974 – 8 April 1997
- Preceded by: Constituency established
- Succeeded by: Stephen Ladyman
- Constituency: South Thanet (1983–1997); Thanet East (1974–1983)

Personal details
- Born: 30 August 1942 (age 84) Dublin, Ireland
- Party: Conservative (1966–2004); UKIP (2004–2007)
- Spouses: Lolicia Olivera Azucki (m. 1979; div. 1998) Elizabeth Rees-Williams (m. 2003; died 2022)
- Children: 4, including Alexandra
- Parent(s): Sir William Aitken; Penelope, Lady Aitken
- Education: Eton College
- Alma mater: Christ Church, Oxford; Wycliffe Hall, Oxford
- Website: Official website

Jonathan William Patrick Aitken (born 30 August 1942) is an Anglo-Irish author, Church of England priest and former Conservative Party politician. Beginning his career in journalism, he was elected to Parliament in 1974 (serving until 1997), and was a member of the cabinet during John Major's premiership from 1994 to 1995. In April 1995, he was accused by The Guardian of misdeeds conducted under his official government capacity. He sued the newspaper for libel in response, but the case collapsed, and he was subsequently found to have committed perjury during his trial. In 1999, he was sentenced to 18 months in prison, of which he served seven months.

Following his imprisonment, Aitken became a Christian and later became the honorary president of Christian Solidarity Worldwide. He was ordained as an Anglican priest in 2019.

== Family ==
Aitken's parents were Sir William Aitken, a former Conservative MP, and Penelope Aitken, daughter of John Maffey, 1st Baron Rugby.

Aitken is a great-nephew of the newspaper magnate and war-time minister, Max Aitken, 1st Baron Beaverbrook. His sister is the actress Maria Aitken and his nephew is the actor Jack Davenport. He is godfather to James Abbott, the son of Labour left-winger Diane Abbott, who had been his voting pair.

In 1979, Aitken married Serbian Lolicia Olivera Azucki, a daughter of O. Azucki, living in Zürich, Switzerland; they divorced in 1998. With his first wife, he had twin daughters and one son, Alexandra and Victoria Aitken, and William Aitken respectively.

Aitken married his second wife, Elizabeth Harris, daughter of David Rees-Williams, 1st Baron Ogmore, and former wife of actors Richard Harris and Sir Rex Harrison, in June 2003.

In 1999, DNA testing confirmed that Petrina Khashoggi, putative daughter of billionaire arms dealer Adnan Khashoggi, was Aitken's biological child, the result of an affair with Khashoggi's wife Soraya (née Sandra Daly). The paternity of Aitken himself has similarly been under question. In December 2008, Dutch historian Cees Fasseur said Aitken was the result of a wartime affair between Prince Bernhard of the Netherlands and Penelope Aitken.

== Early life ==
Aitken was born in Dublin, Ireland. His grandfather, Sir John Maffey (who was created The 1st Baron Rugby in February 1947), was the first official British representative to the newly independent Irish state, being appointed in October 1939, at a time when Anglo-Irish relations were strained but improving. Maffey's official title was "United Kingdom Representative to Éire". Aitken was baptised on 16 October 1942 at St Patrick's Cathedral, Dublin, an Anglican church, and he was named "Jonathan William Patrick Aitken". The third name, "Patrick", was included at a late stage owing to the unexpected international importance of the occasion –- one of the Irish papers reported "British envoy's grandson is a real Paddy". The Taoiseach, Éamon de Valera, who knew his grandparents, asked to attend the christening and his presence at the baptism was symbolic of improving Anglo-Irish relations. Also attending was Princess Juliana (later to become Queen Juliana of the Netherlands) as his godmother.

Aitken contracted tuberculosis, and at four years of age was admitted to Cappagh Hospital, Dublin, where he was an inpatient on a TB ward for more than three years, being cared for and educated by Catholic nuns. His father was severely injured as an RAF pilot when his Spitfire was shot down during the Second World War.

Aitken recovered and was discharged from the hospital aged seven. He lived with his parents at Halesworth, Suffolk, and learned to walk properly again within a few months.

Aitken was educated at Orwell Park School and then privately educated at Eton College, and then studied law at Christ Church, Oxford. His career initially followed a similar path to the post-war career of his father, who became a journalist and then the Conservative Member of Parliament for Bury St Edmunds.

== Journalism and business ==
He served as a war correspondent during the 1960s in Vietnam and Biafra, and gained a reputation for risk-taking when he took LSD in 1966 as an experiment for an article in the London Evening Standard and had a bad trip: "this drug needs police, the Home Office and a dictator to stamp it out".

He was also a journalist at Yorkshire Television from 1968 to 1970, presenting the regional news show Calendar. Aitken was the first person to be seen on screen from Yorkshire Television when it began broadcasting.

In 1970, Aitken was acquitted at the Old Bailey of charges of breaching section 2 of the Official Secrets Act 1911, when he photocopied a report about the British government's supply of arms to Nigeria, and sent a copy to The Sunday Telegraph and to Hugh Fraser, a pro-Biafran (Nigerian Civil War) Tory MP. As a result of the case he was dropped as the Conservative candidate for the Thirsk and Malton parliamentary constituency.

Aitken was managing director of the Middle Eastern division of Slater Walker in 1973–75 and chairman of R. Sanbaar Consultants Ltd from 1976 to at least 1982, and a director of arms exporting firm BMARC from 1988 to 1990.

== Parliamentary career ==
Aitken initially worked in parliament as private secretary to Conservative MP Selwyn Lloyd in 1964–66.

Defeated at Meriden in the West Midlands in 1966 and dropped as candidate for Thirsk and Malton (above), he was elected as MP for Thanet East in the February 1974 general election; from 1983 he sat for South Thanet. He managed to offend PM Margaret Thatcher by ending a relationship with her daughter, Carol Thatcher, and suggesting that Thatcher "probably thinks Sinai is the plural of Sinus" to an Egyptian newspaper. He stayed on the backbenches throughout Thatcher's premiership, as well as participating in the re-launch of TV-AM, when broadcaster Anna Ford threw a glass of wine at him to express her outrage at both his behaviour and the unwelcome consequent transformation of the TV station.

=== Hollis affair ===
Aitken wrote a highly confidential letter to Thatcher in early 1980, dealing with allegations that the former Director-General of MI5, Sir Roger Hollis, had been a double agent also working for the Soviet Union. This information had come to Aitken from retired CIA spymaster James Angleton. Espionage historian Chapman Pincher obtained a copy of the letter, and used former MI5 officers Peter Wright and Arthur Martin as his main additional secret sources, to write the sensational book Their Trade is Treachery in 1981. This matter continued to be highly controversial throughout the 1980s, and led to Wright eventually publishing his own book Spycatcher in 1987, despite the government's prolonged Australian court attempts to stop him from doing so.

=== Minister of State for Defence Procurement ===
Aitken became Minister of State for Defence Procurement under prime minister John Major in 1992. He was later accused of violating ministerial rules by allowing an Arab businessman to pay for his stay in the Paris Ritz, perjured himself and was jailed (see below).

Aitken had previously been a director of BMARC, an arms exporter during 1988–1990. In 1995, a Commons motion showed that while a Cabinet minister he had signed a controversial Public Interest Immunity Certificate (PIIC) in September 1992 relating to the Matrix Churchill trial, and that the "gagged" documents included ones relating to the supply of arms to Iran by BMARC for a period when he was a director of the company.

=== Chief Secretary to the Treasury ===
He became Chief Secretary to the Treasury in 1994, a Cabinet position, but resigned in 1995 following the allegations that he had violated ministerial rules.

He was defeated in the 1997 general election. Within a year he had been appointed as a representative for the defence manufacturer GEC-Marconi (part of BAE Systems since November 1999).

== Libel, arrest and prison ==
=== Libel action ===
On 10 April 1995, The Guardian carried a front-page report on Aitken's dealings with leading Saudis. The story was the result of a long investigation carried out by journalists from the newspaper and from Granada Television's World in Action programme. The Guardian also alleged Aitken, when Minister for Defence Procurement, procured prostitutes for Arab businessmen. Granada's World in Action programme repeated the accusation in a television documentary called Jonathan of Arabia.

Aitken had called a press conference at the Conservative Party offices in Smith Square, London, at 5 p.m. that same day denouncing the claims and demanding that the World in Action documentary, which was due to be screened three hours later, withdraw them. He said:

If it falls to me to start a fight to cut out the cancer of bent and twisted journalism in our country with the simple sword of truth and the trusty shield of British fair play, so be it. I am ready for the fight. The fight [is] against falsehood and those who peddle it. My fight begins today. Thank you and good afternoon.

The World in Action film Jonathan of Arabia was transmitted as planned and Aitken carried out his threat to sue. The action collapsed in June 1997 (a month after he had lost his seat in the 1997 general election) when The Guardian and Granada produced, via their counsel George Carman, evidence countering his claim that his wife, Lolicia Aitken, paid for the hotel stay at the Ritz Hotel in Paris. The evidence consisted of airline vouchers and other documents showing that his wife had, in fact, been in Switzerland at the time when she had allegedly been at the Ritz in Paris. The joint Guardian/Granada investigation indicated an arms deal scam involving Aitken's friend and business partner, the Lebanese businessman Mohammed Said Ayas, a close associate of Prince Mohammed of Saudi Arabia. It was alleged that Aitken had been prepared to have his teenage daughter lie under oath to support his version of events, had the case continued.

A few days after the libel case collapsed, World in Action broadcast a special edition, which echoed Aitken's "sword of truth" speech. It was titled "The Dagger of Deceit".

During this time, it emerged that when Aitken was being encouraged to resign, he was chairman of the secretive right-wing think-tank Le Cercle, alleged by Alan Clark to be funded by the CIA.

=== Perjury conviction and imprisonment ===
Aitken was charged with perjury and perverting the course of justice and, after pleading guilty on 8 June 1999 to both offences, was sentenced to jail for 18 months of which he served almost seven months as a custodial sentence. While Aitken was sentenced, Mr Justice Scott Baker said Aitken had breached trust inexcusably. Baker told Aitken: "For nearly four years you wove a web of deceit in which you entangled yourself and from which there was no way out unless you were prepared to come clean and tell the truth. Unfortunately you were not."

During the preceding libel trial, his wife Lolicia, who later left him, was called as a witness to sign a supportive affidavit to the effect that she had paid his Paris hotel bill, but did not appear. In the end, with the case already in court, investigative work by The Guardian reporters into Swiss hotel and British Airways records showed that neither his daughter nor his wife had been in Paris at the time in question.

=== Bankruptcy ===
Aitken was unable to cover the legal costs of his libel trial and was declared bankrupt. As part of the bankruptcy, his trustees settled legal actions against the magazine Private Eye, over the claims it had made that Aitken was a "serial liar". He also became one of the few people to resign from the Privy Council. Aitken's wife and three daughters turned up to support him when he was sentenced.

== Christian faith ==
Aitken attended the Alpha Course in 1997, which he said stirred his interest in Christianity. He attended the course on further occasions prior to imprisonment. After being imprisoned in 1999, he began to study the Bible, learned Greek, and became a student of Christian theology at Wycliffe Hall, Oxford. This part of his life is covered in two autobiographical works called Pride and Perjury and Porridge and Passion.

Aitken's claim that he had found God was met with some scepticism. Aitken said: "In a different era, I'd have been one of the cynics myself. If I'd had a parliamentary colleague who’d got into trouble, gone to jail and come out saying, 'I've found God', I'd have said, 'Oh, how very convenient for him'."

The Guardian might insist that Aitken demonstrate the sincerity of repentance by repaying the whopping legal bill of one-and-half-million pounds he landed on them by his dishonest libel action. He was allowed to drop the case on promising to pay costs, but then escaped from the liability when he declared himself bankrupt and revealed that most of his apparent assets turn out to be conveniently owned by other people. The Guardian still believe he has more resources than he will admit.

In 2000 he said that he would not become a vicar because he considered himself not worthy of the office and "wouldn't like to give dog-collars a bad name".

In 2006 Aitken became honorary president of Christian Solidarity Worldwide.

=== Ordained ministry ===
On 30 June 2018, Aitken was ordained in the Church of England as a deacon by Sarah Mullally, the Bishop of London. Since then he has served as a non-stipendiary minister at St Matthew's Church, Westminster and as a chaplain of Pentonville Prison.

Exactly one year after becoming deacon, on 30 June 2019, Aitken was ordained as an Anglican priest in St Mary's Church, Stoke Newington, also by the Bishop of London.

== Political comebacks ==
In early 2004, some constituency party members in Aitken's former seat of South Thanet proposed that he should return as Conservative candidate for the seat in the 2005 general election. This was vetoed by Conservative Party leader Michael Howard.

Aitken later confirmed that he would not attempt a return to Parliament, saying that "the leader has spoken. I accept his judgement with good grace." He denied rumours he was to stand as an independent candidate insisting that he was not a "spoiler".

Aitken later declared his support for the UK Independence Party (UKIP) a week before the party's equally strong performance as the Liberal Democrats, with both parties winning 12 seats each in the 2004 European elections. On 2 October 2004, Aitken attended the (UKIP) conference and re-iterated his support for the party.

In November 2007, with the approval of senior members of the shadow cabinet, he took charge of a task force on prison reform within Iain Duncan Smith's Centre for Social Justice to help formulate Conservative Party policy. Aitken said this was not part of a political comeback. Conservative spokesmen pointed out that the task force is independent of the party, even though the organisation was run by Iain Duncan Smith. The report Locked Up Potential: A Strategy to Reform our Prisons and Rehabilitate our Prisoners was published in March 2009.

=== Parliamentary access ===
In September 2020, it was revealed that the former Speaker of the House of Commons, John Bercow, awarded Aitken a parliamentary pass despite the House of Commons claiming that former MPs who had been sentenced to a period of imprisonment of one year or more were ineligible. In September 2020 Aitken had held a pass continuously since at least December 2015.

== Works ==
=== The Young Meteors ===
In his early book The Young Meteors (London: Secker & Warburg, 1967; New York: Atheneum, 1967), Aitken profiled the brightest lights among the younger generation in Britain, and particularly London, with a hint in the title that many of these were likely to burn and crash. Hunter Davies, one of the people profiled, has pointed out that such lists of the promising were then common in The Sunday Times, but unusual as books. Much later, Craig Taylor in 2003 observed that those profiled who were still burning brightly included Michael Caine, David Bailey, Twiggy, David Frost and Don McCullin. Taylor found it humdrum, but:

the book is worth re-examining these many years later for one reason. Aitken, it has been shown over time, is a figure we can always learn something from, a kind of walking, well-groomed Grimm's fairy tale. . . . In [this book] he intuits the popularity and importance of unquantifiable lists of who is hot, young and going places.

Aitken himself in 2003 had a low opinion of the book: "In terms of style, it was certainly the worst book I've ever written". Yet the title was memorable: it was consciously adopted by Martin Harrison for a survey of British photojournalism (including Bailey and McCullin) of about the same period.

=== Nazarbayev and the Making of Kazakhstan: From Communism to Capitalism ===
In 2009 Aitken published a biography of Nursultan Nazarbayev, the President of Kazakhstan, with the subject's cooperation. The Diplomat observed that the publisher's note "describes Nazarbayev as a 'widely admired' leader, which is an interesting descriptor for a political leader who has never won an election deemed free or fair." Aitken received a Kazakh award for his "huge contribution to making Kazakhstan popular in the world and promoting its global reputation".

The book sold only 466 copies and was widely panned by critics, The Guardian noting that the book "relies, for supporting evidence, on the good opinions of his [Nazarbayev's] friends (or of those too cowed to utter a word out of place). It becomes curiously tolerant when oppression, corruption and galloping megalomania are on the menu." The review also described it as "a fascinating, cleverly orchestrated snow job: quite probably the hagiography of the year." The London Review of Books wrote that the flattery within the biography ranged "from the banal to the cringing." Eurasianet wrote that it was a "hagiography" that was part of Nazarbayev's personality cult.

In 2021, documents leaked in the Pandora Papers suggested that Aitken was paid £166,000 for writing the book by organisations with links to the Government of Kazakhstan, despite Aitken telling Reuters at the time of the publication "that he had not received any payment from the government." One invoice from Aitken's firm dated April 2009 for £33,333 is marked as "agreed final instalment fee for book project".

=== Other books ===
Aitken has written several Christian religious books since his release from prison. He has published two books of prayers, Prayers for People under Pressure (2006), and Psalms for People Under Pressure (2004), and wrote a biography of the English slaver, and later Anglican clergyman and abolitionist John Newton, John Newton: From Disgrace to Amazing Grace, in 2007.

Aitken has written several biographies of political figures, including the President of the United States Richard Nixon (Nixon: A Life, 1993). He also wrote on Nixon's co-conspirator in the Watergate scandal, Charles Colson (Charles W. Colson: A Life Redeemed, 2005). Colson had assisted Aitken in his biography of Nixon, and had later corresponded with Aitken urging him to repent in the wake of the Guardian libel case. Aitken published a book of personal recollections of Margaret Thatcher, Margaret Thatcher: Power and Personality, after her death in 2013.

== Bibliography ==
- A Short Walk On The Campus (1966, with Michael Beloff)
- Young Meteors (1967)
- Land of Fortune: A Study of the New Australia (1970)
- From John Bull to Uncle Sam: How to Run An Empire (1970)
- Officially Secret (1971)
- A British View of the Middle East Situation (1976)
- Nixon: A Life (1993)
- Pride and Perjury: An Autobiography (2003)
- Psalms for People Under Pressure (2004)
- Porridge and Passion: An Autobiography (2005)
- Charles W. Colson: A Life Redeemed (2005)
- Prayers for People under Pressure (2006)
- Heroes and Contemporaries (2007)
- John Newton (2007)
- Nazarbayev and the Making of Kazakhstan: From Communism to Capitalism (2009)
- Kazakhstan and Twenty Years of Independence (2012)
- Margaret Thatcher: Power and Personality (2013)
- Doing Time: A Spiritual Survival Guide (2021, with Edward Smyth)

== See also ==
- Jeffrey Archer, Aitken's contemporary, another Conservative politician imprisoned for perjury
- Chris Huhne, Liberal Democrat politician, imprisoned for perverting the course of justice

Parliament of the United Kingdom
New constituency	Member of Parliament for Thanet East; 1974–1983	Constituency abolished
New constituency	Member of Parliament for South Thanet; 1983–1997	Succeeded by Stephen Ladyman
Political offices
Preceded by Michael Portillo	Chief Secretary to the Treasury; 1994–1995	Succeeded by William Waldegrave
