= Paris by Night (1988 film) =

1988 film by David Hare

- Directed by: David Hare
- Written by: David Hare
- Produced by: Linda Bruce; Patrick Cassavetti
- Starring: Charlotte Rampling; Michael Gambon
- Cinematography: Roger Pratt
- Edited by: George Akers
- Music by: Georges Delerue
- Release date: 1988
- Country: United Kingdom
- Language: English

Paris by Night is a 1988 British thriller film written and directed by David Hare and starring Charlotte Rampling, Michael Gambon and Iain Glen.

== Plot ==
The film concerns Clara Paige, an unhappily married and ambitious British politician, who spends some time in Paris, but gets caught up in a murder.

== Cast ==
- Charlotte Rampling ... Clara Paige
- Michael Gambon ... Gerald Paige
- Iain Glen ... Wallace Sharp
- Robert Hardy ... Adam Gillvray
- Jane Asher ... Pauline
- Niamh Cusack ... Jenny Swanton
- Julian Firth ... Lawrence
- Linda Bassett ... Janet Swanton
- Robert Flemyng ... Jack Sidmouth
- Juliet Harmer ... Delia
- Alain Fromager ... Paul Zinyafski
- Christopher Baines ... Young Organizer
- Annabel Brooks ... Girl at Gillvray's Office
- Edward Clayton ... Birmingham Chairman
- Brian Cobby ... Foreign Secretary
- Bradley Cole ... Young Man
- Reg Gadney ... British Diplomat
- François Greze ... Young Hotel Clerk
- Czeslaw Grocholski ... Foreign Lecturer
- Peter Whitbread ... English Lecturer
- Sandi Toksvig ... Sandra
