= The Wilde Wedding =

- Directed by: Damian Harris
- Written by: Damian Harris
- Produced by: Andrew Karsch
- Starring: Glenn Close; John Malkovich; Patrick Stewart; Minnie Driver
- Cinematography: Paula Huidobro
- Edited by: Madeleine Gavin
- Distributed by: Vertical Entertainment
- Release dates: September 5, 2017 (Deauville); September 15, 2017 (United States)

The Wilde Wedding is a 2017 romantic comedy film written and directed by Damian Harris, starring Glenn Close, John Malkovich, Patrick Stewart, and Minnie Driver. It received a limited theatrical release and a direct-to-video release, beginning September 15, 2017, by Vertical Entertainment.

== Plot ==
The famous actress Eve Wilde is getting married for the fourth time, this time to the writer Harold. Her first husband, the actor Laurence Darling, and their children and grandchildren attend the wedding. Harold is joined by his two daughters and one of their longtime friends. Sexual tension and romance spread amongst the two families and assembled guests.

== Cast ==
- Glenn Close as Eve Wilde
- John Malkovich as Laurence Darling
- Patrick Stewart as Harold
- Minnie Driver as Priscilla Jones
- Jack Davenport as Rory Darling
- Grace Van Patten as Mackenzie Darling
- Noah Emmerich as Jimmy Darling
- Peter Facinelli as Ethan Darling
- Yael Stone as Clementine
- Lilly Englert as Rose
- Jack Haven (Note: Credited as Brigette Lundy-Paine) as Lara
- Jake Katzman as Sam
- Tim Boardman as Dylan
- Kara Jackson as Bee
- Rob Langeder as Al
- Joe Urla as Nelson
- Santiago The Pawstar as YoYo the dog

== Reception ==
On review aggregator website Rotten Tomatoes, the film holds an approval rating of 27% based on 15 reviews, and an average rating of 5.24/10. On Metacritic, the film has a weighted average score of 31 out of 100, based on 6 critics, indicating "generally unfavorable reviews".
