= Geoffrey Clifton-Brown (Bury St Edmunds MP) =

British Conservative politician (1899–1983)

- Born: 25 July 1899
- Died: 17 November 1983 (aged 84)
- Children: 3
- Relatives: Geoffrey Clifton-Brown (grandson)

Geoffrey Benedict Clifton-Brown (25 July 1899 – 17 November 1983) was a Conservative Party politician in England.

== Early life ==
His father, one-time High Sheriff of Buckinghamshire Edward Clifton-Brown, was a son of James Clifton Brown MP. He was schooled at Eton College, and during World War II, he fought with the 12th Lancers, attaining the rank of lieutenant-colonel.

He was elected at the 1945 general election as member of parliament (MP) for Bury St Edmunds, and held the seat until the 1950 general election, when he did not seek re-election and was succeeded by Conservative William Aitken.

== Family ==
He had three children, and his grandson, also Geoffrey Clifton-Brown, followed him into the House of Commons.

Parliament of the United Kingdom
Preceded by Edgar Mayne Keatinge	Member of Parliament for Bury St Edmunds; 1945 – 1950	Succeeded by William Aitken
