= Maffei (surname) =

Maffei is a surname of Italian origin, derived from Maffeo, an archaic form for 'Matthew'. Notable people with the surname include:

== People of Arts and letters ==
- Andrea Maffei (1798–1885), Italian poet and librettist
- Andrea Maffei (architect) (born 1968), Italian architect
- Cesare Maffei (1805–?), Italian painter
- Claire Mafféi (1919–2004), French actress
- Damian Maffei (born 1977), American actor
- Francesco Maffei (1605–1660), Italian painter
- Francesco Scipione Maffei (1675–1755), Italian art critic, antiquarian, humanist and author
- Giovanni Camillo Maffei (fl. 1562–1573), Italian physician and music theorist
- Paolo Maffei (1926–2009), Italian astrophysicist and author
- Paolo Alessandro Maffei (1653—1716), Italian antiquarian, humanist and author

== People in religion ==
- Antonio Maffei da Volterra (1450–1478), Italian clergyman and member of the Pazzi Conspiracy
- Antonio Maffei (died 1482), Italian Roman Catholic prelate
- Ascanio Maffei (died 1659), Italian Roman Catholic prelate
- Bernardino Maffei (1514–1553), Italian Roman Catholic cardinal
- Giovanni Pietro Maffei (1533–1603), Italian Jesuit and writer
- Giuliano Maffei (died 1510), Italian Roman Catholic prelate
- Marcantonio Maffei (1521–1583), Italian Roman Catholic cardinal
- Orazio Maffei (1580–1609), Italian Roman Catholic cardinal
- Raffaele Maffei (1451–1522), Italian humanist, historian and theologian

== People in sports ==
- Arturo Maffei (1909–2006), Italian long jumper and footballer
- Alberto Maffei (born 1995), Italian snowboarder
- Cecilia Maffei (born 1984), Italian speed skater
- Claudio Maffei (born 1999), Italian footballer
- Giuseppe Maffei (born 1974), Italian runner
- Ivano Maffei (born 1958), Italian cyclist
- Leonard Maffei (died 1989), Italian-American cyclist
- Michele Maffei (born 1946), Italian fencer

== Others ==
- Alessandro Maffei (1662–1730), Bavarian general
- Blanca Renée Arrillaga Oronoz de Maffei, known as Blanca Renée Arrillaga (1917–2011), Uruguayan chemist, botanist and agrostologist
- Clara Maffei (1814–1886), Italian socialite and salon hostess
- Dan Maffei (born 1968), American politician
- Greg Maffei (born 1960), American businessman
- Joseph Anton von Maffei (1790–1870), German industrialist

== See also ==
- Maffeis
- Maffey
- Mattei
- Mazzei
