= Jared Harris =

British actor (born 1961)

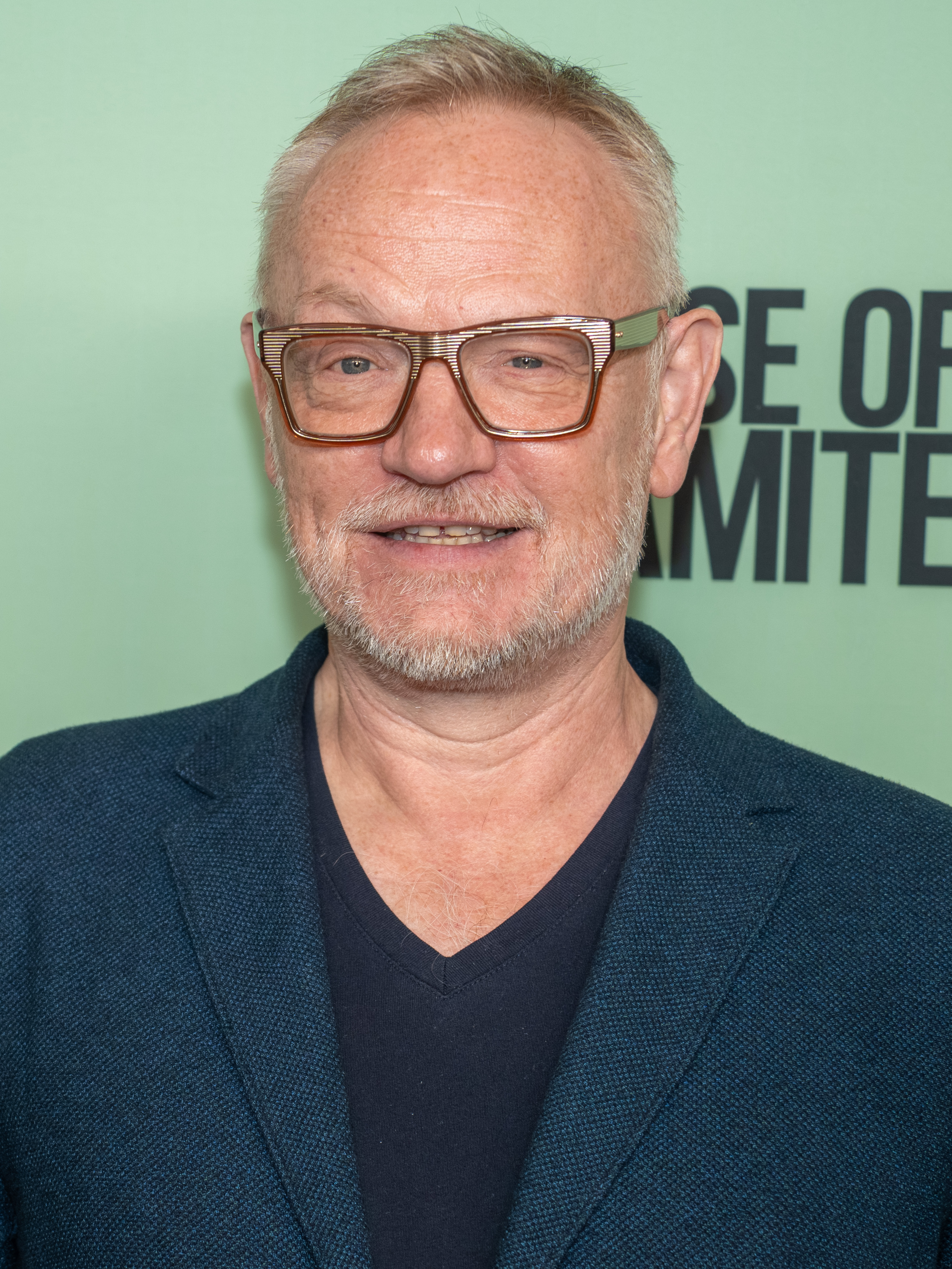
- Harris in 2025
- Born: Jared Francis Harris; 24 August 1961 (age 65); London, England
- Education: Duke University; Central School of Speech and Drama
- Occupation: Actor
- Years active: 1983–present
- Spouses: Jacqueline Goldenberg (m. 1989; div. 1992); Emilia Fox (m. 2005; div. 2010); Allegra Riggio (m. 2013)
- Parents: Richard Harris; Elizabeth Harris Aitken
- Relatives: Damian Harris (brother); Jamie Harris (brother); David Rees-Williams, 1st Baron Ogmore (maternal grandfather); Annabelle Wallis (first cousin once removed)

Jared Francis Harris (born 24 August 1961) is an English actor. The son of the actor Richard Harris, he studied drama at Duke University and the Royal Central School of Speech and Drama. He has received accolades including a British Academy Television Award and a Screen Actors Guild Award as well as nominations for a Golden Globe Award and two Primetime Emmy Awards.

Harris started his professional acting career in productions of the works of William Shakespeare at the Royal Shakespeare Theatre in London and The Public Theater in New York. He made his film debut in a supporting role in the British comedy The Rachel Papers (1989) before playing Andy Warhol in I Shot Andy Warhol (1996) with supporting roles in Far and Away (1992), The Last of the Mohicans (1992), Natural Born Killers (1994), Dead Man (1995), and Happiness (1998). He took a recurring role as David Robert Jones in the Fox science fiction series Fringe (2008–2012).

He received critical attention for his role as Lane Pryce in the AMC period drama series Mad Men (2009–2012), for which he was nominated for the Primetime Emmy Award for Outstanding Supporting Actor in a Drama Series. During this time he took roles in the films The Curious Case of Benjamin Button (2008), Sherlock Holmes: A Game of Shadows (2011), Lincoln (2012) and played Anderson Dawes in the Syfy science fiction series The Expanse (2015–2017) and Captain Francis Crozier in the AMC supernatural horror series The Terror (2018).

Harris played King George VI in the Netflix historical drama series The Crown (2016–2017) for which he was nominated for the British Academy Television Award for Best Supporting Actor. He took a leading role playing Valery Legasov in the HBO miniseries Chernobyl (2019), for which he won the British Academy Television Award for Best Actor and was nominated for the Primetime Emmy Award and Golden Globe Award. His recent film roles include in The Man from U.N.C.L.E. (2015), Certain Women (2016), Allied (2016), A House of Dynamite (2025) and The Brink of War (2026). Since 2021 he has taken the leading role of Hari Seldon in the Apple TV+ science fiction series Foundation.

== Early life ==
Jared Francis Harris was born on 24 August 1961 in Hammersmith, London, the second of three sons of the Irish actor Richard Harris (1930–2002) and his first wife, Elizabeth Rees-Williams (1936–2022), a Welsh socialite. His younger brother is the actor Jamie Harris, his older brother is the director Damian Harris and his maternal grandfather was the politician David Rees-Williams, 1st Baron Ogmore.

Harris was educated at Ladycross School, a former independent preparatory boarding school in the coastal town of Seaford in East Sussex, as were his brothers, Jamie and Damian. He says, "They were famous for discipline, with cold showers every morning", and that "You were never known by your first name there. You were either called by your number, or your last name. Since there were three of us, Damian was 'Harris Ma' for major. I was 'Harris Mi' for minor, and Jamie was 'Harris Minimus,' being the youngest and the smallest". He then attended Downside School, an independent Catholic boarding school in the village of Stratton-on-the-Fosse (near the market town of Shepton Mallet), in Somerset, in South West England. He went on to Duke University in North Carolina, United States, graduating in 1984 with a BFA in drama, then returned to England to train as an actor at the Central School of Speech and Drama, graduating in 1989.

== Career ==
=== 1983–2008 ===
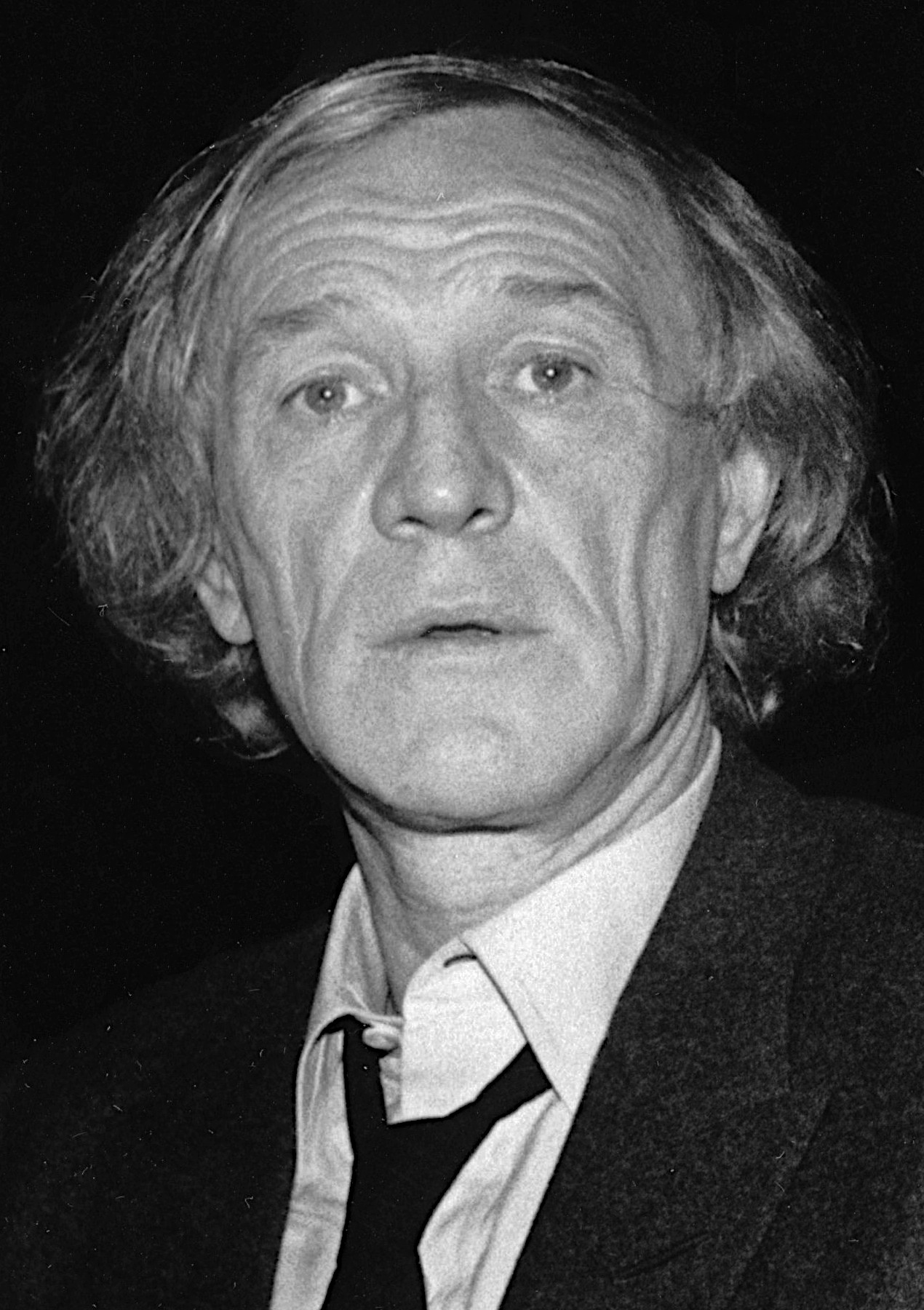
His father, the actor Richard Harris

Harris began his film career directing Darkmoor (1983), an unfinished feature-length film for Duke University's Freewater Films. His first film appearance as an actor was in The Rachel Papers (1989). He took minor roles in films such as the western romance Far and Away (1992), the historical epic The Last of the Mohicans (1992), and the crime drama Natural Born Killers (1994). He took the role of Benmont Tench in Jim Jarmusch's Dead Man (1995). He played the aged Will Robinson in the 1998 movie adaptation of the television series Lost in Space. That same year he played Vladimir in the controversial black comedy drama film Happiness (1998), written and directed by Todd Solondz. He played Kenneth Branagh's character's doppelgänger in How to Kill Your Neighbor's Dog (2000).

Other notable roles include Andy Warhol in I Shot Andy Warhol, John Lennon in the television movie Two of Us (2000) and King Henry VIII in the 2003 BBC film adaptation of the novel The Other Boleyn Girl. Harris played Dr Charles Ashford in Resident Evil: Apocalypse (2004). He played the gruff Captain Anderson in the BBC2 adaptation of To the Ends of the Earth; Mac McGrath in the film Mr Deeds; Eamon Quinn on the FX series The Riches; and David Robert Jones on Fringe.

=== 2009–2017 ===
He gained fame for his portrayal of Lane Pryce in the AMC period drama series Mad Men from 2009 until 2012. The show focuses on the lives of Ad Men in New York City during the 1960s. He first appeared in season three where he arrives as a British newcomer to Sterling Cooper, and later becomes a partner of the new agency Sterling Cooper Draper Pryce. Paul MacInnes of The Guardian wrote of Lane Pryce, "For much of his three season tenure on the show, Lane has seemed like the archetypal Englishman...He was polite, courteous, dry-witted, stingy. He was also apparently logical and keenly stoic, keeping calm and carrying on when Sterling Cooper broke up and its successor nearly went under." Harris received critical acclaim for his final appearance in the episode "Commissions and Fees" as well as a nomination for the Primetime Emmy Award for Outstanding Supporting Actor in a Drama Series, losing to Aaron Paul for Breaking Bad in 2012. He returned to the series to direct the 11th episode of season 7, which aired in 2015.

He played Ulysses S. Grant in Steven Spielberg's acclaimed historical drama film Lincoln (2012).

His portrayal of King George VI in the first series of The Crown was praised by the critic Matt Zoller Seitz, who stated that despite the series' large ensemble, "Harris still manages to communicate the character’s understated sensitivity and awareness of his circumscribed role in England’s drama so poignantly that one can’t help being moved by the performance." He received nominations for the British Academy Television Award for Best Supporting Actor and the Critics' Choice Television Award for Best Guest Performer in a Drama Series.

=== 2018–present ===
He played Captain Francis Crozier in the 2018 series The Terror, based on the Dan Simmons novel of the same name that provided a fictional account of the fate of Franklin's lost expedition. In November 2018, Harris was one of the first recipients of the Royal Canadian Geographical Society's Louie Kamookak Medal, awarded "for making Canada's geography better known to Canadians and to the world", for his portrayal of Captain Crozier. Harris said that he was "gratified" that the series inspired curiosity about the real expedition, remarking, "It’s sort of fitting that history will recall that it was the RCGS that first recognized The Terror, and that we as the recipients walked in the footsteps of Louie Kamookak."

In 2019, Harris played Valery Legasov in the acclaimed miniseries Chernobyl, which revolves around the Chernobyl disaster of 1986 and the cleanup efforts that followed. For that role he won the British Academy Television Award for Best Actor and was nominated for the Primetime Emmy Award for Outstanding Lead Actor in a Limited Series or Movie and Golden Globe Award for Best Actor – Miniseries or Television Film. The series was produced by HBO in the United States and Sky UK in the United Kingdom.

In March 2019 Harris joined Jared Leto in Sony's Spider-Man spinoff Morbius. He plays the developer of psychohistory Hari Seldon in the Foundation television series produced for Apple TV+ which premiered in September 2021.

In 2024 he played the father of a returning missing child in the British psychological thriller film Reawakening, alongside Erin Doherty and Juliet Stevenson.. In 2025 he played the Secretary of Defense in Kathryn Bigelow's A House of Dynamite.

== Personal life ==
Harris married Jacqueline Goldenberg in 1989 and they divorced three years later.

Harris married the actress Emilia Fox, the daughter of the actors Edward Fox and Joanna David, on 16 July 2005. Divorce filings were made in January 2009; the divorce was finalised in June 2010.

In April 2009 Harris met Allegra Riggios, a lighting designer and television host, at a comedy club where a mutual friend was performing. They married on 9 November 2013.

Harris resides in Los Angeles in the United States.

== Acting credits ==
Key
†	Denotes works that have not yet been released

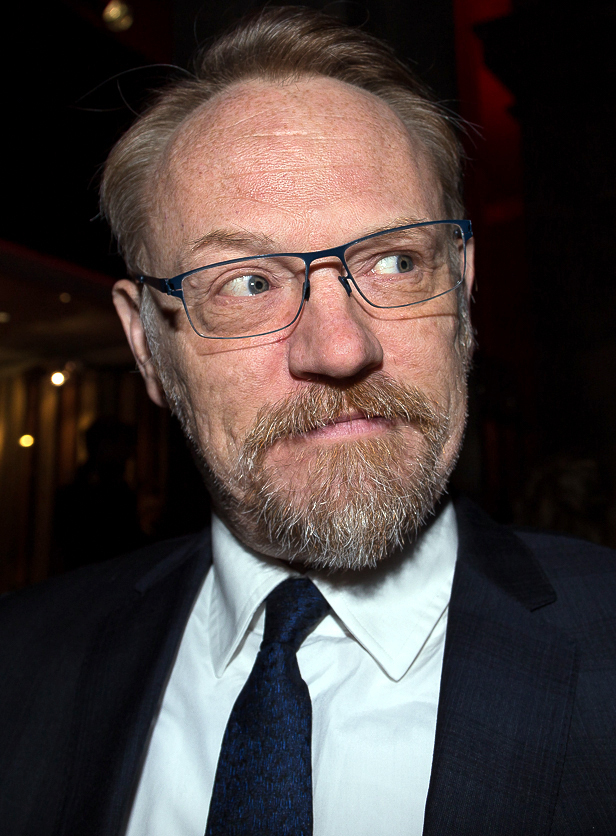
Jared Harris in 2014

=== Film ===
Year	Title	Role	Notes
1989	The Rachel Papers	Geoff	
1992	Far and Away	Paddy	
1992	The Last of the Mohicans	British Lieutenant	
1992	The Public Eye	Danny the Doorman	
1994	Natural Born Killers	London Boy	
1994	Nadja	Edgar	
1995	Smoke	Jimmy Rose	
1995	Dead Man	Benmont Tench	
1995	Blue in the Face	Jimmy Rose	
1995	Tall Tale	Head Thug Pug	
1996	I Shot Andy Warhol	Andy Warhol	
1996	Gold in the Streets	Owen	
1997	Fathers' Day	Lee	
1997	Sunday	Ray	
1997	Chinese Box	William	
1997	White Lies	Jacob Reese	
1998	Happiness	Vlad	
1998	B. Monkey	Alan Furnace	
1998	Lost in Space	Older Will Robinson	
1998	Lulu on the Bridge	Alvin Shine	Uncredited
1998	Trance	Jim	
1999	Lush	W. Firmin Carter	
1999	The Weekend	John Kerr	
2000	Bullfighter	Jones	
2000	How to Kill Your Neighbor's Dog	False Peter	
2000	Shadow Magic	Raymond Wallace	
2001	Perfume	Michael	
2002	Four Reasons	Filmmaker	
2002	Mr. Deeds	Mac McGrath	
2002	Igby Goes Down	Russel	
2002	Dummy	Michael Foulicker	
2003	Sylvia	Al Alvarez	
2003	I Love Your Work	Yehud	
2004	Ocean's Twelve	Basher's Engineer	
2004	Resident Evil: Apocalypse	Dr. Charles Ashford	
2005	The Notorious Bettie Page	John Willie	
2006	Lady in the Water	Goatee Smoker	
2006	Cashback	Alex Proud	Uncredited
2006	Cracked Eggs	Joe	Short film
2007	32A	Ruth's Father	
2008	The Curious Case of Benjamin Button	Captain Mike	
2008	From Within	Bernard Wilburn	
2009	Tales of the Black Freighter	Ridley	Voice
2009	Sherlock Holmes	Professor James Moriarty	(Voice, uncredited)
2010	Extraordinary Measures	Dr. Kent Webber	
2010	The Ward	Dr. Gerald Stringer	
2011	Sherlock Holmes: A Game of Shadows	Professor James Moriarty	
2012	Lincoln	Ulysses S. Grant	
2013	The Mortal Instruments: City of Bones	Hodge Starkweather	
2013	The Devil's Violinist	Urbani	
2014	Pompeii	Severus	
2014	The Quiet Ones	Professor Joseph Coupland	
2014	The Boxtrolls	Lord Charles Portley-Rind	Voice
2015	Poltergeist	Carrigan Burke	
2015	The Man from U.N.C.L.E.	Adrian Sanders	
2016	Certain Women	William Fuller	
2016	The Last Face	Dr. John Farber	
2016	Allied	Frank Heslop	
2019	Robert the Bruce	John Comyn	
2020	Angela's Christmas Wish	The Vet	Voice
2022	Morbius	Emil Nicholas	
2022	The Sea Beast	Captain Crow	Voice
2023	Brave the Dark	Stan Deen	
2024	Reawakening	John	
2025	A House of Dynamite	Secretary of Defense Reid Baker	
2026	The Brink of War	Mikhail Gorbachev	
2026	Violent Night 2 †	TBA	Post-production
TBA	What Happens at Night †	TBA	Post-production
TBA	The Price of Peace †	Winston Churchill	Filming

=== Television ===
Year	Title	Role	Notes
1995	New York Undercover	Seth Baines	Episode: "The Highest Bidder"
2000	Two of Us	John Lennon	Television movie
2003	Without a Trace	Father Walker	2 episodes
2003	The Other Boleyn Girl	King Henry VIII	Television movie
2005	To the Ends of the Earth	Captain Anderson	3 episodes
2006	Coup!	Simon Mann	Television movie
2007	Law & Order: Special Victims Unit	Robert Morten	Episode: "Svengali"
2007	The Shadow in the North	Axel Bellmann	Television movie
2008	The Riches	Eamon Quinn	5 episodes
2008–2012	Fringe	Dr. David Robert Jones	9 episodes
2009–2012	Mad Men	Lane Pryce	26 episodes; Directed episode "Time & Life"
2013	Axe Cop	King of England	Voice; Episode: "An American Story"
2015–2017	The Expanse	Anderson Dawes	7 episodes
2016–2021	Robot Chicken	James Bond Villain / Mr. Weatherbee	Voice; 2 episodes
2016	The Mr. Peabody and Sherman Show	Bigfoot	Voice; Episode: "Sacagawea"
2016–2017	The Crown	King George VI	Main role (Season 1); Supporting role (Season 2); 6 episodes
2018	The Terror	Francis Crozier	10 episodes
2018	Animals	Mr. Budmeizner	Voice; Episode: "Horses"
2019	Chernobyl	Valery Legasov	5 episodes
2019	Carnival Row	Absalom Breakspear	8 episodes
2020	New Looney Tunes	Asteroid	Voice; 2 episodes
2021	The Beast Must Die	George Rattery	Miniseries
2021–present	Foundation	Hari Seldon	Main cast
2022	American Dad!	Merlin	Voice; Episode: "Hayley Was a Girl Scout?"

=== Theatre ===
Year	Production	Role	Venue	Ref.
1989	Hamlet	Fortinbras	Royal Shakespeare Theatre	
1991	Henry IV, Part 1 and Part 2	Henry "Hotspur" Percy	The Public Theater	
1992	'Tis Pity She's a Whore	Soranzo	The Public Theater	
1995	Ecstasy	Len	John Houseman Theater	
1996	King Lear	Edmund	The Public Theater	
2001	More Lies About Jerzy	Jerzy Kosiński	Vineyard Theatre	
2001	Hamlet	Prince Hamlet	Shakespeare Theatre of New Jersey	
2003	Humble Boy	Felix Humble	Manhattan Theatre Club	
2005	Les Liaisons Dangereuses	Vicomte de Valmont	Playhouse Theatre, London	
2006	Period of Adjustment	Ralph Bates	Almeida Theatre	
2023	The Homecoming	Max	Young Vic	
2025	Hamlet	Claudius	Royal Shakespeare Theatre	

== Awards and nominations ==
Year	Award	Category	Project	Result	Ref.
2017	British Academy Television Award	Best Supporting Actor	The Crown (season 1)	Nominated	
2020	British Academy Television Award	Best Actor	Chernobyl	Won	
2016	Critics' Choice Television Awards	Best Guest Performer in a Drama Series	The Crown (season 1)	Nominated	
2019	Critics' Choice Television Awards	Best Actor in a Movie or Miniseries	Chernobyl	Nominated	
2019	Golden Globe Award	Best Actor in a Miniseries or Television Movie	Chernobyl	Nominated	
2012	Primetime Emmy Award	Outstanding Supporting Actor in a Drama Series	Mad Men (episode: "Commissions and Fees")	Nominated	
2019	Primetime Emmy Award	Outstanding Actor in a Limited Series or Movie	Chernobyl	Nominated	
2008	Screen Actors Guild Awards	Outstanding Cast in a Motion Picture	The Curious Case of Benjamin Button	Nominated	
2009	Screen Actors Guild Awards	Outstanding Ensemble in a Drama Series	Mad Men (season 3)	Won	
2010	Screen Actors Guild Awards	Outstanding Ensemble in a Drama Series	Mad Men (season 4)	Nominated	
2012	Screen Actors Guild Awards	Outstanding Ensemble in a Drama Series	Mad Men (season 5)	Nominated	
2019	Screen Actors Guild Awards	Outstanding Actor in a Miniseries or Movie	Chernobyl	Nominated	
2016	Satellite Award	Best Supporting Actor in a Series, Miniseries, or Television Film	The Crown	Nominated	
2018	Satellite Award	Best Actor – Miniseries or Television Film	The Terror	Nominated	
2019	Satellite Award	Best Actor – Miniseries or Television Film	Chernobyl	Won	
1998	Sitges Film Festival	Best Actor	Trance	Won	
2019	San Diego International Film Festival	Cinema Vanguard Award		Won	
