= Maffeo =

Maffeo is an Italian masculine given name (an archaic variant of Matteo 'Matthew') and a surname. Notable people with the name include:

== Given name ==
- Maffeo Barberini (1568–1644), head of the Roman Catholic Church and ruler of the Papal States as Pope Urban VIII
- Maffeo Barberini (1631–1685), Italian nobleman, Prince of Palestrina
- Maffeo Giovanni Ducoli (1918–2012), Italian Roman Catholic prelate
- Maffeo Gherardi (1406–1492), Italian Roman Catholic cardinal
- Maffeo Olivieri (1484–1543/44), Italian sculptor and wood carver
- Maffeo Pantaleoni (1857–1924), Italian economist
- Maffeo Polo (1230–1309), Italian travelling merchant and uncle of the explorer Marco Polo
- Maffeo Vallaresso (1415–1494), Italian Roman Catholic prelate, Venetian patrician and Renaissance humanist
- Maffeo Vegio (1407–1458), Italian Latin-language poet
- Maffeo Verona (1576–1618), Italian painter of the late-Renaissance
- Maffeo Vitale (died 1669), Italian Roman Catholic prelate

== Surname ==
- Jerome Maffeo, American drummer
- Lois Maffeo, American musician and writer
- Pablo Maffeo (born 1997), Spanish footballer
- Víctor Maffeo (born 2000), Spanish footballer

== See also ==
- Portrait of Maffeo Barberini (c. 1598) by Caravaggio
- Maffei (surname)
- Mazzeo
