= The Rachel Papers =

- Directed by: Damian Harris
- Screenplay by: Damian Harris
- Based on: The Rachel Papers by Martin Amis
- Produced by: Andrew S. Karsch
- Starring: Dexter Fletcher; Ione Skye; Jonathan Pryce; James Spader
- Cinematography: Alex Thompson
- Edited by: David Martin
- Music by: Chaz Jankel; David Storrs
- Production companies: Initial Film and Television; Longfellow Pictures; Virgin Films
- Distributed by: Virgin Vision
- Release date: 12 May 1989
- Running time: 95 minutes
- Country: United Kingdom
- Language: English
- Box office: $201,468 (USA)

The Rachel Papers is a 1989 British comedy drama film written and directed by Damian Harris, and based on the 1973 novel of the same name by Martin Amis. It stars Dexter Fletcher and Ione Skye with Jonathan Pryce, James Spader, Bill Paterson, Jared Harris, Claire Skinner, Lesley Sharp and Michael Gambon in supporting roles.

== Plot ==
Charles is a confident and intelligent nineteen-year-old, about to attend Oxford University. Charles is a computer nerd and has developed a methodical approach to seduction, and compiles detailed computer files and elaborate plans to seduce the girls he is interested in. His latest target is a beautiful American girl, Rachel. Charles becomes infatuated with Rachel, and after numerous rebuffs he eventually forms a friendship with her.

Rachel already has a boyfriend, control freak DeForest who treats her badly. With help from his sister Jenny, his eccentric brother-in-law Norman, and friend and mentor Geoff, Charles lures Rachel away from DeForest. His father Gordon is impressed with Charles' new girlfriend. As the unlikely relationship develops, Charles discovers his seemingly "perfect" woman has bad habits and personality flaws, just like all the "lesser" girls he has previously seduced.

Charles becomes bored and is seduced by his old flame Gloria, ending his relationship with Rachel, who moves to New York. Charles goes to Oxford University but misses Rachel. They meet by chance in a museum and spend the day together, but when parting Rachel only kisses him on the cheek. Charles says in voiceover that he tried, but failed, to remember William Blake's quotation about love being eternal, so that he could say it to Rachel.

== Cast ==
- Dexter Fletcher as Charles Highway, a confident, intelligent student, who uses elaborate plans and detailed computer files to seduce the girls he is interested in
- Ione Skye as Rachel Noyce, Charles' latest infatuation
- Jonathan Pryce as Norman, Charles' brother-in-law
- James Spader as Deforest, Rachel's current boyfriend
- Lesley Sharp as Jenny, Charles' sister
- Claire Skinner as Gloria, a former conquest
- Bill Paterson as Gordon Highway, Charles' father
- Michael Gambon as Doctor Knowd
- Jared Harris as Geoff, Charles' friend
- Aubrey Morris as Sir Herbert
- Shirley Anne Field as Mrs. Seth Smith
- Pat Keen as Mrs. Tauber
- Amanda De Cadenet as Cathy
- Gina McKee as Jackie

== Reception ==
Internationally the film was not a significant commercial success, and in the US was ranked 206 in 1989.

=== Critical response ===
On Rotten Tomatoes, the film has an approval rating of 45% based on 11 reviews, with an average rating of 4.9/10. On Metacritic the film has a weighted average score of 56 out of 100 based on reviews from 7 critics, indicating "mixed or average reviews".

Hal Hinson of The Washington Post praises the performance of Jonathan Pryce, and calls Fletcher "a genuine star". Hinson views the use of monologue positively, saying that directly addressing the audience "draw[s] us into an atmosphere of puckish intimacy, and immediately we become accomplices in his plots -- happy accomplices." Praising Fletcher he concludes "His devilish precocity makes "The Rachel Papers" a bracing treat." Barry McIlheney of Empire give the film 2/5 and writes "Captures the brash boldness of the novel, but not the literary wit. A misguided affair."

Variety says the book brought a fresh direction to old ideas but is critical of the film as "Director Damian Harris isn't able to capture the book's special charms, and resorts to having his young hero address the camera to keep the viewer in the picture." Variety is critical of Fletcher's performance, calling him too self-conscious and "a less than endearing hero", but praises Skye for her sensual performance. Time Out London is critical of the film, writing "the humour is as smug, adolescent and misogynist as it was in the novel". The reviewer says the performance of the lead actors are insubstantial, but also overshadowed by Pryce's crowd-pleasing cameo, putting the blame on the director and script for the barely developed characters and the lack of detail: "The result is without dramatic or moral weight, despite Highway's contrived comeuppance, and it's impossible to care about the characters."
