= Damian Harris =

British filmmaker (born 1958)

- Born: Damian David Harris; 2 August 1958 (age 67); London, England
- Occupations: Film director; screenwriter
- Years active: 1989–present
- Spouse: Annabel Brooks (m. 1981; div. 1990)
- Partner: Peta Wilson (1997–2002)
- Children: 2
- Parents: Richard Harris (father); Elizabeth Rees-Williams (mother)
- Relatives: Jared Harris (brother); Jamie Harris (brother); David Rees-Williams (grandfather); Annabelle Wallis (first cousin once removed)

Damian David Harris (born 2 August 1958) is an English filmmaker. He is the eldest son of the actor Richard Harris and socialite Elizabeth Rees-Williams.

== Career ==
In 1968, Harris debuted on screen playing Miles in the film Otley. At the age of 16, he appeared on his father's album of poetry and songs, I, in the membership of my days, together with his brothers Jared and Jamie. Harris attended Downside School, Somerset, England. Later he studied screenwriting at New York University.

He debuted as a director with short movies Killing Time (with Eric Stoltz) and Greasy Lake and then moved to full-length movies debuting with The Rachel Papers, the adaptation of Martin Amis' novel. He has also directed episodes for several television series.

== Personal life ==
Harris was born on 2 August 1958 in London, the eldest of three sons of the Irish actor Richard Harris and his first wife, Welsh actress Elizabeth Rees-Williams. His brothers are actors Jared Harris and Jamie Harris.

In 1981, Harris married English actress Annabel Brooks. They have one child together, daughter Ella. Later the pair divorced. From 1997, up until their separation in 2002, Harris lived with Australian model and actress Peta Wilson. They have one child together, born in 2002.

== Filmography ==
=== Director ===
Year	Film	Notes
1984	Killing Time	Short film
1988	Greasy Lake	Short film
1989	The Rachel Papers	Also screenwriter
1991	Deceived	
1992	Chillers	TV series (1 episode); also screenwriter
1995	Bad Company	
1996	Strangers	TV series
1998	Sins of the City	TV series (2 episodes)
2000	Mercy	Also screenwriter
2008	Gardens of the Night	Also screenwriter & producer
2012	To the Moon	Short film
2017	The Wilde Wedding	Also screenwriter
2023	Brave the Dark	Also screenwriter

=== Actor ===
Year	Film	Role	Notes
1968	Otley	Miles	
