= David Rees-Williams, 1st Baron Ogmore =

British politician

The Right Honourable The Lord Ogmore PC
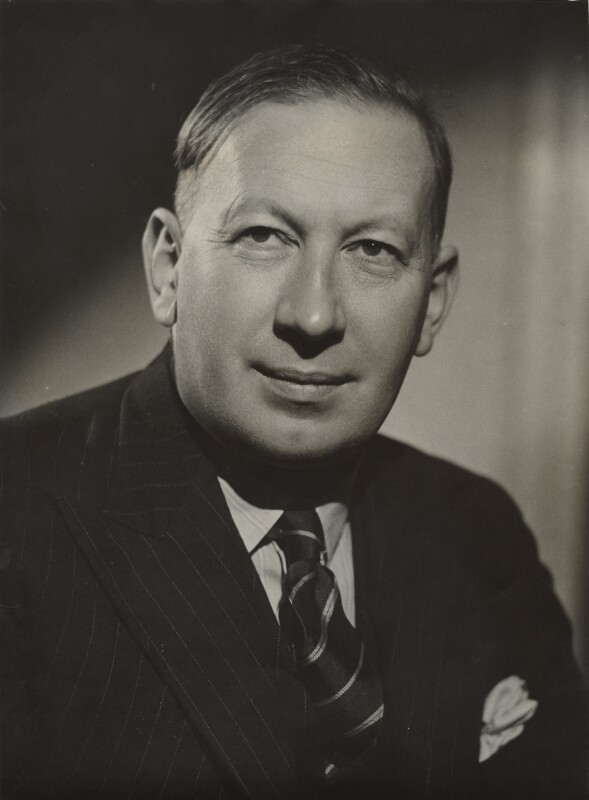
- Rees-Williams in 1947

President of the Liberal Party
- In office 11 September 1963 – 31 October 1964
- Leader: Jo Grimond
- Preceded by: Felix Brunner
- Succeeded by: Roger Fulford

Minister of Civil Aviation
- In office 1 June 1951 – 26 October 1951
- Prime Minister: Clement Attlee
- Preceded by: Frank Pakenham
- Succeeded by: John Maclay (Minister of Transport and Civil Aviation)

Under-Secretary of State for Commonwealth Relations
- In office 4 July 1950 – 1 June 1951
- Prime Minister: Clement Attlee
- Preceded by: Angus Holden
- Succeeded by: George Bingham

Under-Secretary of State for the Colonies
- In office 7 October 1947 – 2 March 1950
- Prime Minister: Clement Attlee
- Preceded by: Ivor Bulmer-Thomas
- Succeeded by: Thomas Cook

Member of the House of Lords
- Lord Temporal
- In office 5 July 1950 – 30 August 1976
- Preceded by: Peerage created
- Succeeded by: Gwilym Rees-Williams

Member of Parliament for Croydon South
- In office 29 July 1945 – 3 February 1950
- Preceded by: Herbert Williams
- Succeeded by: Richard Thompson (Croydon West)

Personal details
- Born: David Rees-Williams; 22 November 1903 Bridgend, Wales, UK
- Died: 30 August 1976 (aged 72)
- Party: Liberal (1959–1976)
- Other political affiliations: Labour (until 1959)
- Spouse: Constance Wills
- Children: 3, including Elizabeth Harris Aitken
- Parent: William Rees Williams (father)
- Occupation: Solicitor

David Rees Rees-Williams, 1st Baron Ogmore, PC, TD (22 November 1903 – 30 August 1976) was a British politician.

== Early life and career ==
Rees-Williams was born in Bridgend, Wales, the son of William Rees Williams, of Garth-celyn, Bridgend, and Jennet, daughter of Morgan David, of Bridgend. William Rees Williams was a veterinary surgeon, and had served as a captain in the Royal Army Veterinary Corps. He qualified as a solicitor in 1929. Commissioned into the 6th (Territorial Army) Battalion, Welch Regiment, he was promoted Captain in 1936 and Major in 1938, by which time his battalion had become a searchlight unit. He transferred to the Royal Artillery in 1940, when all searchlight units did so, and ended the Second World War as a Lieutenant-Colonel.

== Political career ==
Rees-Williams was elected Labour Member of Parliament for Croydon South in 1945, defeating the incumbent MP, Sir Herbert Williams. In the government he was a minister in the Colonial Office, travelling to East Asia to consider the movements towards independence. His seat was redistributed at the end of the Parliament and he narrowly lost the successor seat at the 1950 general election and was raised to the peerage as Baron Ogmore, of Bridgend in the County of Glamorgan, on 10 July 1950. He served as Minister of Civil Aviation in 1951 and was made a Privy Councillor the same year. Lord Ogmore was President of the London Welsh Trust, which ran the London Welsh Centre, Gray's Inn Road, from 1955 until 1959.

One of his trips was to Sarawak, to ascertain the views of the public regarding becoming a British colony. He was accompanied by a Conservative MP, David Gammans.

Lord Ogmore joined the Liberal Party in 1959 and served as Liberal Party President, 1963–1964.

== Personal life ==
In 1930, Lord Ogmore married (Alice Alexandra) Constance, daughter of Walter Robert Wills, Lord Mayor of Cardiff from 1945 to 1946. He had three children. His daughter, Elizabeth Rees-Williams, married the actors Richard Harris and Sir Rex Harrison, the businessman Peter Aitken, and Jonathan Aitken, the former Conservative MP. His grandsons are actors Jared Harris and Jamie Harris and director Damian Harris.

== Honours ==
Coat of arms of David Rees-Williams, 1st Baron Ogmore
Crest A tiger’s head couped Proper charged on the neck with three chevronels couped Gules. Escutcheon Azure two bars wavy Argent on a chief arched of the second between as many hurts each charged with a quatrefoil Or a hurt thereon a sun in splendour of the third. Supporters Dexter a tiger Proper charged on the shoulder with three chevronels couped Gules, sinister a horse Argent. Motto Ffyddlon Hyd Angau (Faithful Unto Death)

=== Foreign honour ===
- Myanmar :
  - Agga-Maha-Thayay-Sithu of the Order of the Pyidaungsu Sithu Thingaha (1956)
- Malaya :
  - Honorary Commander of the Order of the Defender of the Realm (P.M.N. (K)) - Tan Sri (1959)

Parliament of the United Kingdom
Preceded by Herbert Williams	Member of Parliament for Croydon South; 1945–1950	Succeeded by Richard Thompson as MP for Croydon West
Political offices
Preceded by Ivor Bulmer-Thomas	Under-Secretary of State for the Colonies; 1947–1950	Succeeded by Thomas Fotheringham-Cook
Preceded by The Lord Pakenham	Minister of Civil Aviation; 1951	Succeeded by John Maclay
Party political offices
Preceded by Felix Brunner	President of the Liberal Party; 1963–1964	Succeeded by Roger Fulford
Preceded by ?	President of the Welsh Liberal Party ?–1970	Succeeded by Rhys Lloyd
Peerage of the United Kingdom
New creation	Baron Ogmore; 1950–1976	Succeeded by Gwilym Rees Rees-Williams
