= Jack Davenport =

English actor (born 1973)

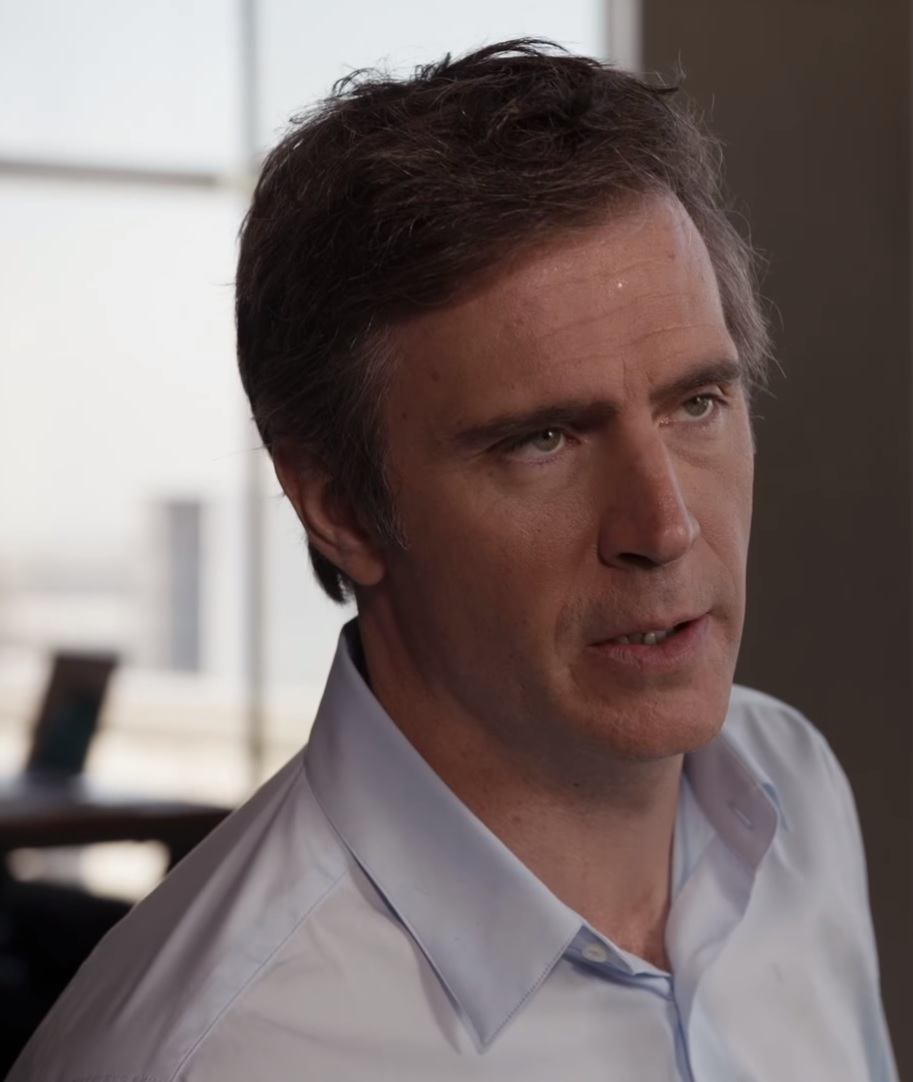
- Davenport in White Famous in 2017
- Born: Jack Arthur Davenport; 1 March 1973 (age 53); Wimbledon, London, England
- Citizenship: United Kingdom; United States
- Education: Dragon School; Cheltenham College; University of East Anglia
- Occupation: Actor
- Years active: 1996–present
- Spouse: Michelle Gomez (m. 2000)
- Children: 1
- Parents: Nigel Davenport (father); Maria Aitken (mother)
- Relatives: Jonathan Aitken (uncle); Penelope Aitken (grandmother); William Aitken (grandfather); John Maffey, 1st Baron Rugby (great-grandfather)

Jack Arthur Davenport (born 1 March 1973) is an English actor. He is best known for his roles in the television series This Life and Coupling, and as James Norrington in the Pirates of the Caribbean film series. He has also appeared in other Hollywood films, such as The Talented Mr. Ripley and Kingsman: The Secret Service. On television, Davenport is known for his roles in the ensemble drama series FlashForward, Smash, and The Morning Show as well as his leading role in the 2013 ITV drama series Breathless.

== Early life and education ==
Davenport, the son of actor Nigel Davenport and actress Maria Aitken, was born in Wimbledon, London, and lived in Ibiza, Spain, for the first seven years of his life. Davenport was privately educated at the Dragon School in Oxford and Cheltenham College in Gloucestershire, before studying English Literature and Film at the University of East Anglia.

== Career ==
After Davenport's graduation, his mother advised him to write to John Cleese requesting work on the set of his upcoming film, Fierce Creatures, so that he could gain experience behind the camera. Cleese instead sent Davenport's letter to the casting department, and he was subsequently cast in his first onscreen role as a trainee zookeeper. After the production of Fierce Creatures was completed, Davenport found an agent who secured him an audition for the role of Miles Stewart in the BBC television drama series This Life.

Since then Davenport has played roles in many successful films and TV series, including The Talented Mr. Ripley, Coupling and Ultraviolet, as well as the box office hit Pirates of the Caribbean: The Curse of the Black Pearl, and its sequels, Dead Man's Chest and At World's End.

During his career Davenport has also performed voice-overs, having narrated the audio versions of John Buchan's The Thirty-Nine Steps and recorded parts in Anthony Burgess's A Clockwork Orange. He also provides the voice over for the British MasterCard advertisements (the American being done by Billy Crudup).

In 2006, he featured in the ITV1 drama The Incredible Journey of Mary Bryant and in 2009 starred in the film The Boat That Rocked.

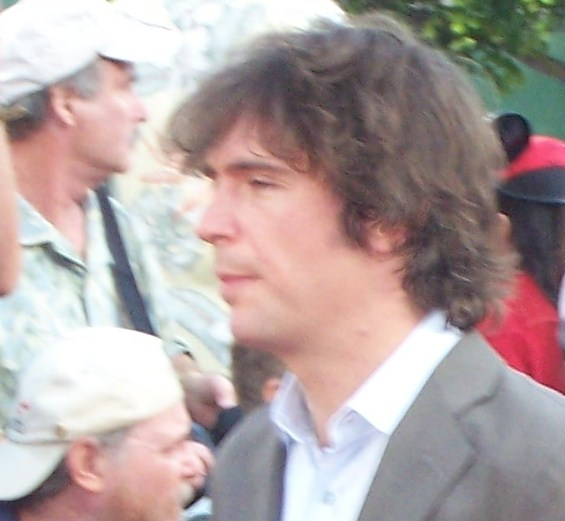
Davenport in 2007

In 2007 Davenport was cast in Swingtown, a period and relationship drama for CBS about the impact of sexual and social liberation in 1970s American suburban households, with story arcs involving open marriages and key parties. The series was cancelled after one season.

In 2008, Davenport was cast in the ABC pilot FlashForward, which was based on a Robert J. Sawyer novel. In the series, Davenport played the character of Lloyd Simcoe, a physicist allegedly responsible for a worldwide blackout, which causes the whole world to see the future. The show was cancelled after a single season.

In February 2011, Davenport was cast in the NBC musical drama pilot Smash. It ran for two seasons and became a cult favorite on streaming services. The first season of the series follows a group of people putting on a Marilyn Monroe musical on Broadway. Davenport plays the musical's director. The second season expands as the various cast members branch out into other productions; Davenport's character, Derek Wills, quits the Broadway production of Bombshell to pursue a small off-Broadway musical and take it to Broadway with his protégé, Karen Cartwright (Katharine McPhee). The season ends with the two shows competing at the Tonys.

Davenport starred as the replacement singer in the video for Snow Patrol's single "Called Out in the Dark", released on YouTube on 17 August 2011, alongside Tara Summers and Gary Lightbody.

2018 saw Davenport's Broadway debut playing the Earl of Warwick in a revival of George Bernard Shaw's Saint Joan starring Condola Rashad.

== Filmography ==
=== Film ===
Key
| † | Denotes films that have not yet been released |

| Year | Title | Role | Notes |
|---|---|---|---|
| 1997 | Fierce Creatures | Student Zoo Keeper | |
| 1997 | The Moth | Robert Bradley | TV film |
| 1998 | Macbeth | Malcolm | TV film |
| 1998 | Tale of the Mummy | Detective Bartone | |
| 1998 | The Wisdom of Crocodiles | Sergeant Roche | |
| 1999 | The Cookie Thief | A Man | Short film |
| 1999 | The Talented Mr. Ripley | Peter Smith-Kingsley | |
| 2000 | The Wyvern Mystery | Harry Fairfield | TV film |
| 2000 | Offending Angels | Rory | |
| 2001 | Gypsy Woman | Leon | |
| 2001 | The Bunker | LCpl. Ebert | |
| 2001 | Subterrain | Businessman | |
| 2001 | Not Afraid, Not Afraid | Michael | |
| 2001 | Look | Stanley | Short film |
| 2002 | The Real Jane Austen | Henry Austen | TV documentary film |
| 2003 | Pirates of the Caribbean: The Curse of the Black Pearl | Commodore James Norrington | |
| 2003 | Eroica | Prince Lobkowitz | TV film |
| 2003 | The Welsh Great Escape | Narrator | TV film |
| 2004 | The Boy Who Would Be King | Narrator | TV documentary film |
| 2004 | Terrible Kisses | Man | Short film |
| 2004 | The Libertine | Harris | |
| 2005 | The Wedding Date | Edward Fletcher-Wooten | |
| 2005 | A Higher Agency | John | Short film |
| 2006 | Pirates of the Caribbean: Dead Man's Chest | James Norrington | Teen Choice Award for Choice Rumble |
| 2007 | This Life + 10 | Miles Stewart | TV film |
| 2007 | Pirates of the Caribbean: At World's End | Admiral James Norrington | |
| 2009 | That Deadwood Feeling | Jack | |
| 2009 | The Boat That Rocked | Twatt | |
| 2011 | The Key Man | Bobby | |
| 2011 | Mother's Milk | Patrick Melrose | |
| 2013 | Haven't We Met Before? | Man | Short film |
| 2014 | Death Knight Love Story | Zeliek | |
| 2014 | Kingsman: The Secret Service | James Spencer / Lancelot | |
| 2014 | Sea of Fire | Marty Kesowich | TV film |
| 2016 | Guernica | Vasyl | |
| 2016 | Americana | Calib | |
| 2016 | A United Kingdom | Alistair Canning | |
| 2016 | Untitled Sarah Silverman Project | Blake | TV film |
| 2016 | Prototype | Edward Conway | TV film |
| 2017 | The Tank | Will Sacks | |
| 2017 | The Wilde Wedding | Rory Darling | |
| 2017 | The Stolen | Joshua McCullen | |
| 2017 | Doomsday | Warren | TV film |
| 2021 | Dagger | Will | Short film, voice role |
| TBA | Blueberry Inn † | | Post-production |
| TBA | Vivien & the Florist † | Laurence Olivier | Post-production |

=== Television ===
| Year | Title | Role | Notes |
|---|---|---|---|
| 1996–1997 | This Life | Miles Stewart | Series regular |
| 1998 | Ultraviolet | Detective Sergeant Michael Colefield | Series regular |
| 1999 | Boiling Point | Narrator | Mini-series |
| 1999 | Omnibus | Narrator | Episode: "Our Julie" |
| 2000–2004 | Coupling | Steve Taylor | Series regular |
| 2001 | Scribbling | Narrator | Episode: "Part Two" |
| 2002 | Dickens | Charley Dickens | 2 episodes |
| 2004 | Agatha Christie's Marple | Superintendent Harper | Episode: "The Body in the Library" |
| 2005–2007 | The Incredible Journey of Mary Bryant | Lieutenant Ralph Clarke | Mini-series |
| 2008 | Swingtown | Bruce Miller | Series regular |
| 2009–2010 | FlashForward | Lloyd Simcoe | Series regular |
| 2012–2013 | Smash | Derek Wills | Series regular |
| 2013 | Breathless | Otto Powell | Series regular |
| 2014 | The Good Wife | Frank Asher | Episode: "Parallel Construction, Bitches" |
| 2015 | Life in Squares | Older David Garnett | 1 episode |
| 2016 | The Mindy Project | Leland Breakfast | Episode: "Leland Breakfast Is the Miracle Worker" |
| 2017 | White Famous | Peter King | Series regular |
| 2018 | Next of Kin | Guy Harcourt | Mini-series |
| 2018 | Deception | Alistair Black | 3 episodes |
| 2019 | Why Women Kill | Karl Grove | Series regular |
| 2019 | The Morning Show | Jason Craig | Series regular |
| 2021 | Why Women Kill | The Narrator | Series regular |
| 2022 | Ten Percent | Jonathan Nightingale | Series regular |
| 2023 | Accused | John | 1 episode |
| 2023 | Dr. Death | Nils Headley | 6 episodes, Season 2 |
| 2025 | The Assassin | Sean | 1 episode |
| 2025 | The Forsytes | James Forsyte | Main cast |
| 2025 | All's Fair | Oliver Draycott | Episode: "When We Were Young" |

=== Theatre ===
| Year | Play | Role | Venue | Notes |
|---|---|---|---|---|
| 1991 | Hamlet | | Theatr Clwyd, Mold, Flintshire | |
| 1999 | The Tempest | Various | | with Holders Season Barbados |
| 2001 | The Servant | Tony | Lyric Theatre, London | |
| 2002 | Lady Windermere's Fan | Lord Darlington | Theatre Royal Haymarket, London | |
| 2003 | How to Lose Friends & Alienate People | Toby Young | Soho Theatre, London | |
| 2006 | Enemies | Yakov Bardin | Almeida Theatre, London | |
| 2018 | Saint Joan | Earl of Warwick | Samuel J. Friedman Theatre, New York City | |
| 2024 | The Human Body | George Blythe | The Donmar Warehouse, London | |

=== Radio ===
- Alistair Cooke's American Journey (2006) (BBC Radio 4)
- Jack Davenport reads The Raw Shark Texts by Steven Hall

== Awards and nominations ==
| Year | Award | Category | Work | Result |
|---|---|---|---|---|
| 2002 | Laurence Olivier Awards | Most Promising Performer | The Servant | Nominated |
| 2006 | Teen Choice Awards | Choice Movie: Rumble (with Orlando Bloom) | Pirates of the Caribbean: Dead Man's Chest | Won |

== Personal life ==
Davenport's uncle is writer and former Conservative Party MP Jonathan Aitken, his maternal grandmother was socialite Penelope Aitken, his maternal grandfather was politician William Aitken, and one of his maternal great-grandfathers was John Maffey, 1st Baron Rugby.

Davenport has been married to actress Michelle Gomez since 2000. On 28 February 2023, Gomez announced on Instagram that she, Davenport, and their son had become naturalized citizens of the United States of America.
