= Maria Aitken =

Theatre director, actress and writer

- Born: Maria Penelope Katharine Aitken; 12 September 1945 (age 81); Dublin, Ireland
- Education: Riddlesworth Hall; Sherborne School for Girls; University of Oxford
- Occupations: Theatre director; teacher; actor; writer
- Years active: 1967–present
- Spouses: Richard Durden (m. 1968; div. 1971) Nigel Davenport (m. 1972; div. 1981) Patrick McGrath (m. 1991)
- Children: Jack Davenport
- Parent(s): William Aitken; Penelope Aitken
- Relatives: Jonathan Aitken (brother); John Maffey, 1st Baron Rugby (maternal grandfather); Max Aitken, 1st Baron Beaverbrook (granduncle)

Maria Penelope Katharine Aitken (born 12 September 1945) is an Irish-born, British theatre director, teacher, actor, and writer.

As an actor, Aitken has been twice nominated at the Olivier Awards, in 1980 for Private Lives and in 1985 for Waste. Her performance in the film A Fish Called Wanda (1988) earned her a nomination for the BAFTA Award for Best Actress in a Supporting Role.

== Early life and education ==
Aitken was born in Dublin, Ireland and privately educated at Riddlesworth Hall Preparatory School in Norfolk, Sherborne School for Girls in Dorset and the University of Oxford where she studied English literature and language as an undergraduate student of St Anne's College, Oxford.

== Career ==
Aitken has directed several plays in the West End and on Broadway. Her production of The 39 Steps, which ran in London for nine years, also played three years on Broadway and won Olivier and Tony Awards. In 2011, she directed Frank Langella in Man and Boy on Broadway. She is a visiting lecturer at Yale University, NYU and Juilliard drama schools. Her acting career includes leading roles at the Royal National Theatre, the Royal Shakespeare Company and in the West End. She has played more Noël Coward leads than any other actress. Her film career includes appearances in Doctor Faustus (1967), Mary, Queen of Scots (1971), Half Moon Street (1986), A Fish Called Wanda (1988) (for which she was nominated for a BAFTA award), A Bit of Fry & Laurie (Series 2 - 1990), The Fool (1990), The Grotesque (1995), Fierce Creatures (1997), Jinnah (1998) and Asylum (2005).

In 1984, Aitken co-wrote and starred in the sitcom Poor Little Rich Girls alongside Jill Bennett. She is the author of A Girdle Round the Earth, a story of some of the remarkable women travellers of the last 200 years, and Style: Acting in High Comedy, published in 1996, which contends that "High comedies are not bloodless, refined, wordy plays — their themes are sex, money and social advancement. They contain a splendid contradiction: wit and elegance at the service of man's basest drives."

== Personal life ==
Aitken is the daughter of William Aitken, a Conservative MP, and Penelope Aitken, whose father was John Maffey, 1st Baron Rugby. Maffey was the UK Representative to Ireland (1939–49). She is a great-niece of newspaper magnate and war-time minister Lord Beaverbrook, and sister to former Conservative cabinet minister Jonathan Aitken.

Aitken is the mother of actor Jack Davenport, born during her marriage to Nigel Davenport from 1972 to 1981. She was married to Richard Durden from 1968 to 1971. Since 1991, she has been married to the novelist Patrick McGrath and they live together in New York and London.

Aitken has served as a patron of the British Thyroid Foundation since 1992, and was appointed a Trustee of the Noël Coward Foundation in 2012.
