= Mazzeo =

Mazzeo is an Italian surname. Notable people with the surname include:

- Fabio Mazzeo (born 1983), Italian footballer
- Edward Mazzeo (born 1980), American Sporting Arms Executive
- Rafe Mazzeo (born 1961), American mathematician
- Rosario Mazzeo (1911–1997), American clarinetist
- Vince Mazzeo (born 1964), American politician
- Tilar J. Mazzeo (born 1971), American writer
- Larry Mathews (born Mazzeo 1955), American child actor: The Dick Van Dyke Show

== See also ==
- Mazzeo Island, an island of Antarctica
