= Penelope Aitken =

English socialite (1910-2005)

The Honourable Lady Aitken MBE
- Born: Penelope Loader Maffey; 2 December 1910; Peshawar, the British Raj (today Pakistan)
- Died: 7 February 2005 (aged 94)
- Spouse: Sir William Aitken
- Children: Jonathan Aitken; Maria Aitken
- Parents: John Maffey, 1st Baron Rugby (father); Dorothy Gladys Huggins (mother)

Penelope Loader, Lady Aitken, MBE (2 December 1910 – 7 February 2005), styled The Honourable Lady Aitken and nicknamed 'Pempe', was an English socialite.

== Biography ==
Born Penelope Loader Maffey, she was the daughter of Sir John Maffey, later 1st Baron Rugby, who was to become Governor-General of the Anglo-Egyptian Sudan, Permanent Under-Secretary of State for the Colonies and wartime United Kingdom Representative to Dublin. Earlier, he had been the private secretary to the Viceroy of India and Governor of the North-West Frontier Province, thus Penelope was born in Peshawar and spent her early years in India, where three of her siblings died in childhood.

When she was seven years old, she returned to England for prep school, then went on to Sherborne School for Girls. Her parents had a house, Anmer Hall, on the King's Sandringham estate, which led to her socialising with the royal family. Indeed, she became the King's favourite. Maffey was presented at Court and named Debutante of the Year. She was romantically linked with several men, including Prince Bernhard of Lippe-Biesterfeld, Esmond Harmsworth and society artist Simon Elwes (1902–1975), which caused a minor scandal as he was married and a Roman Catholic. Maintaining a friendship, she accompanied Prince Bernhard on his honeymoon in 1937 and became good friends with his new wife, Princess Juliana of the Netherlands.

In 1938 she met Canadian William Aitken, a nephew of media magnate Lord Beaverbrook, and a journalist at the Evening Standard. They were married later that year at St Peter's, Eaton Square. Their son Jonathan was born in Dublin in 1942.

In December 2008, Dutch historian Cees Fasseur claimed that Jonathan Aitken was actually the result of a wartime affair between Penelope and Prince Bernhard of the Netherlands. The prince's wife Queen Juliana of the Netherlands stood sponsor for Jonathan Aitken's christening.

William Aitken had joined the RAF and Penelope joined the WRVS, helping to evacuate German children to Ireland. In 1944, her husband was badly hurt in a Spitfire crash. She spent two years nursing him back to health, at a time when her baby son was ill with tuberculosis and the family home in London was bombed. She and William had a daughter Maria in 1945.

William was elected as Conservative Member of Parliament for Bury St Edmunds in 1950, and he was knighted in 1963, giving her the style of Lady Aitken. She devoted herself to community work in support of her husband's political career, becoming a magistrate and running the Clothing Exchange, which played a major role in helping the victims of the East Coast floods in 1953. Eventually she was appointed a Member of the Order of the British Empire (MBE).

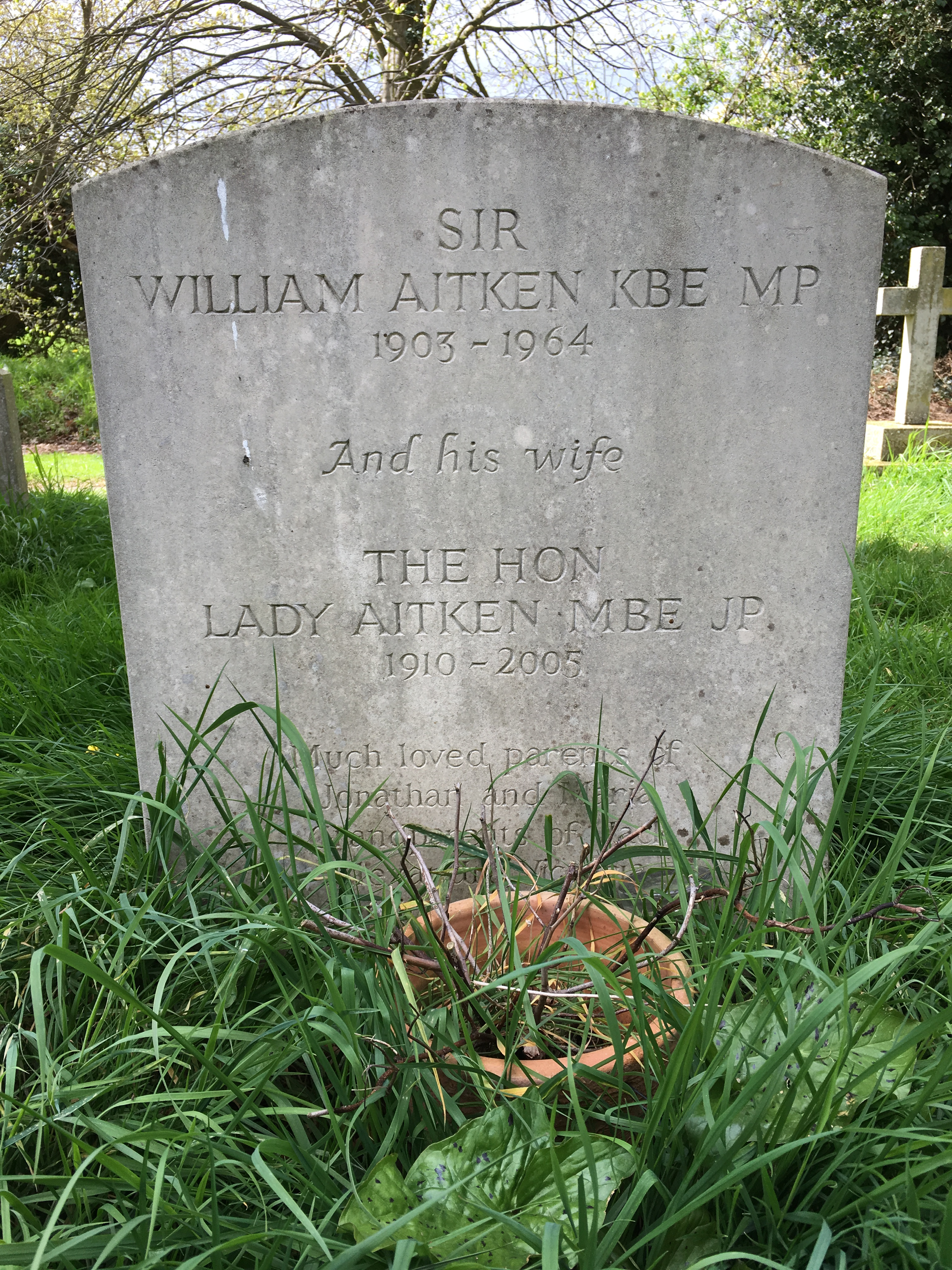
The grave of Sir William and Lady Aitken in the churchyard of St Mary, Playford

She lived with the children in Halesworth to be near her father, who died in 1969 aged 91. The family fortune was wiped out by death duties and a stock market crash. She restarted her affair with Simon Elwes, and then had a long relationship with Sir John Davis, chairman of Rank Xerox. Gardening was another passion. She created a garden at Playford, her moated Tudor house near Ipswich. Later she created an English garden at her house near Santa Eulalia on the Spanish island of Ibiza, smuggling sacks of soil and rare plants through customs.

Lady Aitken continued to be seen at many parties and with many men. Satirist and broadcaster Noel Picarda instantly fell in love with her, and eventually became her live-in companion until his death in 2003. Her house and her parties were often the scene of political machinations in Conservative circles and she was often seen holding court among politicians or her family, whether in London, her local pub or the Gironde.

Aitken died of cancer, aged 94. She had two children – Jonathan Aitken and Maria Aitken. She was the grandmother of the actor Jack Davenport, Petrina Khashoggi (biological daughter of Jonathan Aitken and Soraya Khashoggi (née Sandra Daly), conceived while she was married to Adnan Khashoggi), Victoria Aitken, Alexandra Aitken and William Aitken. She is buried in the churchyard of St. Mary's, Playford, Suffolk.
