= John Maffey, 1st Baron Rugby =

British civil servant and diplomat (1877–1969)

The Right Honourable The Lord Rugby GCMG KCB KCVO CSI CIE
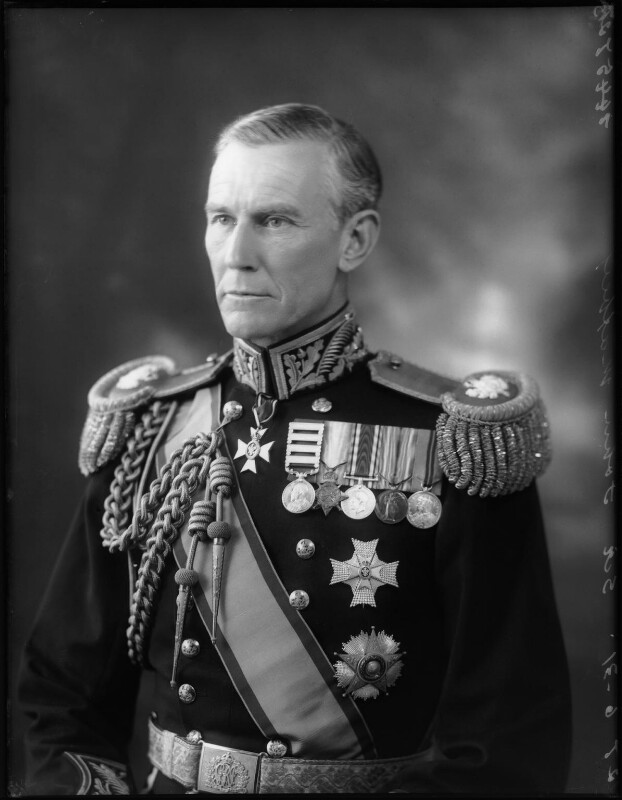
- 1931 portrait

United Kingdom Representative to Éire
- In office 1939–1949
- Monarch: George VI
- Prime Minister: Neville Chamberlain; Winston Churchill; Clement Attlee
- Preceded by: Office established
- Succeeded by: Sir Gilbert Laithwaite

Governor-General of Sudan
- In office 31 October 1926 – 10 January 1934
- Monarch: George V
- Preceded by: Sir Geoffrey Archer
- Succeeded by: Sir Stewart Symes

Personal details
- Born: John Loader Maffey; 1 July 1877 Rugby, Warwickshire, England
- Died: 20 April 1969 (aged 91) Bungay, England
- Spouse: Dorothy Gladys Huggins (m. 1907)
- Children: 3, incl. Alan and Penelope
- Education: Christ Church, Oxford
- Occupation: Civil servant; diplomat

John Loader Maffey, 1st Baron Rugby (1 July 1877 – 20 April 1969), was a British civil servant and diplomat who was a key figure in British–Irish relations during the Second World War.

== Biography ==
=== Early life ===
John Loader Maffey was born on 1 July 1877 in Rugby, Warwickshire, the younger son of Thomas Maffey, a commercial traveller, and Mary Penelope Loader. He was educated at Rugby School and Christ Church, Oxford.

=== Career ===
Maffey entered the Indian Civil Service in 1899, and served as Assistant Secretary to the Chief Commissioner of North-West Frontier Province from 1912 to 1916 and then as Private Secretary to the Viceroy of India Lord Chelmsford from 1916 to 1920 and then Chief Commissioner of the North-West Frontier Province from 1921 to 1924. He was appointed CSI in the 1920 Birthday Honours. He was attached to Prince Arthur, Duke of Connaught during his visit to India. For his services he was appointed Knight Commander of the Royal Victorian Order in February 1921. After a disagreement with the British government in 1924, Maffey resigned from the Indian Civil Service. In 1926 he became Governor-General of Sudan, followed in 1933 by his appointment as Permanent Under-Secretary of State for the Colonies.

== Representative to Ireland ==
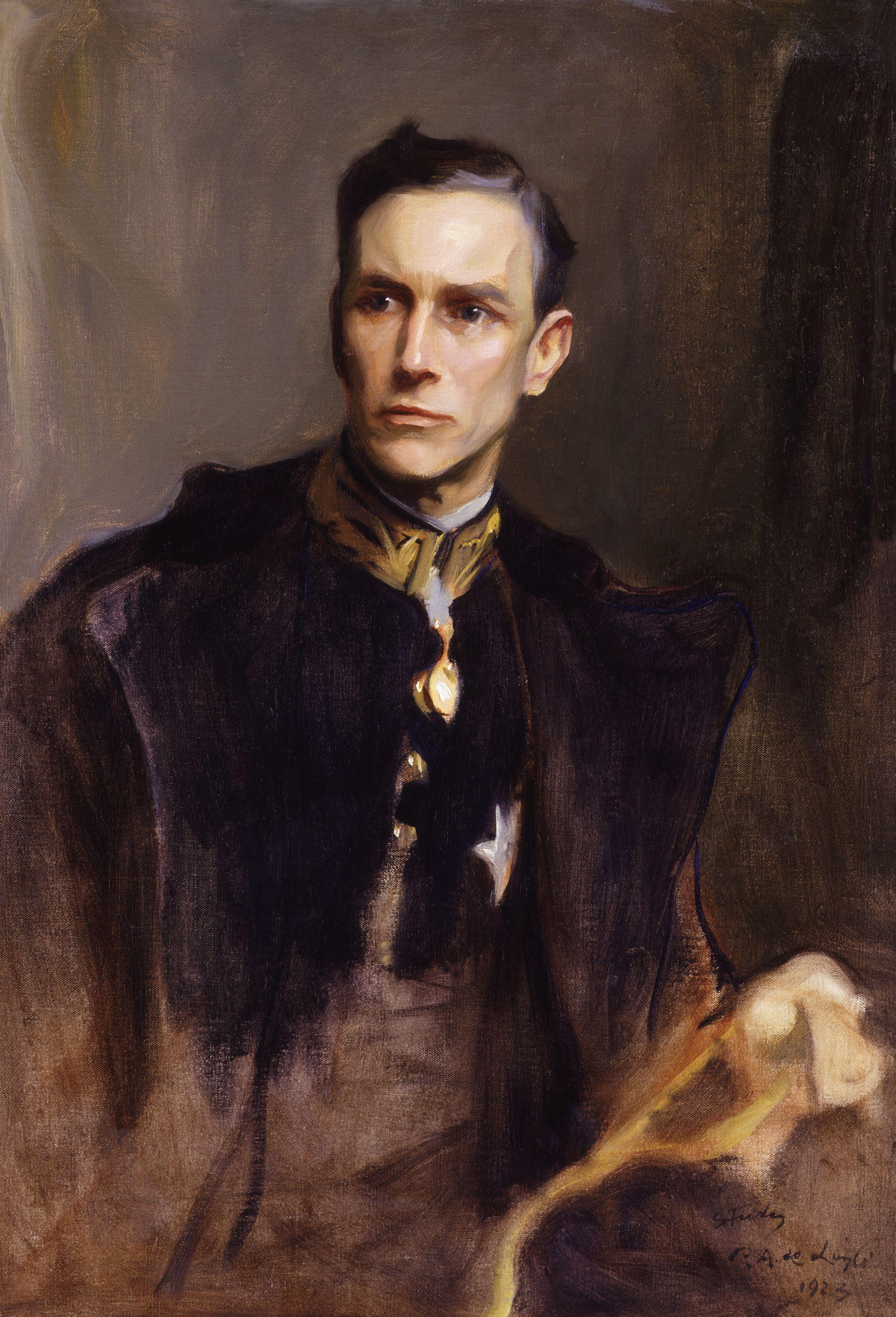
Portrait by Philip de László, 1923

On 14 September 1939, two weeks after the outbreak of World War II, Maffey arrived in Dublin to discuss the possibility of the United Kingdom appointing a British representative to Ireland. Later, following a discussion at the British War Cabinet, Maffey was sent back to Dublin again with a letter from Prime Minister Neville Chamberlain appealing once again for the appointment of a 'representative'. The United Kingdom would not agree to appoint an ambassador or a minister, because it would imply that Ireland was a foreign country outside the Commonwealth. On the other hand, Ireland would not agree to the appointment of a High Commissioner to Ireland because that would imply that Ireland was in the Commonwealth which the Irish government did not accept. As a compromise, Chamberlain proposed the title "United Kingdom Representative in Éire", but Taoiseach Éamon de Valera rejected this, insisting that the word 'in' be replaced with 'to'. And so "United Kingdom Representative to Éire" was agreed upon and Maffey was appointed on 3 October 1939. For de Valera, the change signified Ireland's independence, sovereignty and equality with the United Kingdom.

Chamberlain remarked that the title would "seem to be well suited to an appointment such as this which is essentially an emergency arrangement intended to meet a temporary but urgent situation". After Maffey took up his appointment as "Representative", there were reports that the Irish Republican Army might abduct or kill him.

Maffey held the post throughout the war years and until his retirement in 1949. During the war, he was undoubtedly the most important foreign diplomat resident in Dublin, given the complications of Ireland's neutrality policy. As "United Kingdom Representative to Eire", Maffey quickly established a good working relationship with Éamon de Valera. De Valera was personally in favour of the survival of democracy but did not necessarily trust the British to look after Ireland's best interests. Maffey was vital in mediating between the 'Warlord' Churchill and 'the Chief' de Valera.

When de Valera was replaced by a coalition, headed by John A. Costello, in 1948, Maffey again established a good working relationship with its members, but he was scathing about the clumsy manner in which the declaration of a Republic was handled: "Mr. Costello has handled the business in a slipshod and amateur fashion".

He encouraged John Betjeman, the press attaché, to establish friendly relations with leading and rising figures in the Dublin literary world, such as Patrick Kavanagh; Maffey himself suggested the subject for one of Kavanagh's poems.

In his memorandum, "The Irish Question in 1945", addressed to the Secretary of State for the Dominions, Maffey expressed his view: "To-day, after six years' detachment, Eire is more than ever a foreign country. It is so dominated by the National Catholic Church as to be almost a theocratic State. Gaelic is enforced in order to show that Eire is not one of the English-speaking nations; foreign games are frowned upon, the war censorship has been misapplied for anti-British purposes, anti-British feeling is fostered in school and by Church and State by a system of hereditary enemy indoctrination. There is probably more widespread anti-British sentiment in Eire to-day than ever before." Commenting on a recent attack by Churchill on de Valera, Maffey reported "Nothing helped Mr. de Valera more than Mr. Churchill's personal attack.... The Irish are a very distinct race, and their marked characteristics persist strongly.... There still persist the dark Milesian strain, the tribal vendetta spirit, hatred and blarney, religious fanaticism, swift alternations between cruelty and laughter. A knowledge of the North-West Frontier tribes of India is a good introduction to an understanding of the Irish. They are both very remarkable and in many ways attractive people, with the same mental kinks. We were wise enough not to attempt to bring the Afridis under our direct rule." He continued "Mr. de Valera is not himself a hater of England, as Mr. Frank Aiken, the Finance Minister, is.... There is very little of the Irishman in Mr. de Valera. He is trusted because of his austerity and his cold mathematical approach to Anglo-Irish problems. He understands the narrowness of the Irish mind and does not venture on to broader paths, though he might certainly have led his people out of spiritual bondage in 1941, when America came into the war."

Maffey felt that "we can now talk to Eire on a cold, factual, horse-trading basis, knowing perfectly well that the cards are in our hands." He continued, "It must be admitted that, by ascribing Dominion status to Eire, we placed in unfriendly hands a power to weaken the conception and responsibilities of Dominion status. Eire has none of the attributes of a Dominion. She is a "Scotland " gone wrong, and we cannot afford to let her be completely divorced from the strategic and economic zone of England, Scotland and Wales." Turning to Northern Ireland, Maffey remarked, "Unhappily it is not possible for us to feel satisfied with the state of affairs in Northern Ireland. The Unionist Government are fighting an insidious enemy who is gaining upon them. Their ballot box is not safe over a period against the Catholic birth rate. The loyalty of the local garrison is not proof against the attractions of a lower income-tax rate in Eire. They are vulnerable to world criticism. The British Government cannot afford to ignore the pronouncement made in November 1944 by the Catholic Archbishop of Westminster, the Most Rev. Dr. Griffin, that there is religious persecution at the present day in Northern Ireland."

In February 1947, Maffey was raised to the peerage as Baron Rugby, of Rugby in the County of Warwick.

His portrait hangs in the National Portrait Gallery of the United Kingdom. Painted by Philip de László in 1923, it was the study for two official portraits, at Government House, Peshawar, and Christ Church, Oxford.

== Family ==
On 28 August 1907, Maffey married Dorothy Gladys Huggins. They had three children: Alan, Henry, and Penelope. Alan succeeded his father as Baron Rugby. Penelope married the war hero and Tory MP Sir William Aitken, and became a well-known socialite. She was the mother of the former Conservative politician Jonathan Aitken and the actress Maria Aitken. Her grandchildren include actor Jack Davenport.

Lord Rugby died at his home on 8 Flixton Road, Bungay, on 20 April 1969 at the age of 91.

== Popular culture ==
Maffey was played by Peter Copley in the 1983 RTÉ drama series Caught in a Free State.

He is a minor character in the 2010 novel Long Time Coming by Robert Goddard.

== Arms ==
Coat of arms of John Maffey, 1st Baron Rugby
Crest A gauntlet fessewise grasping a lantern Proper. Escutcheon Ermine a fort with two towers Proper issuant from the base a pile reversed Sable a chief dancettée Or surmounted by a pile Azure charged with an increscent Argent. Supporters On either side an Afghan hound Proper gorged with a collar the chain reflexed over the back Or. Motto Pass Friend

== See also ==
- List of Ambassadors from the United Kingdom to Ireland

Government offices
Preceded by Alfred Hamilton Grant	Chief Commissioner of the North-West Frontier Province; 8 March 1921 – July 1923	Succeeded by Horatio Norman Bolton
Preceded by Sir Geoffrey Francis Archer	Governor-General of the Sudan; 1926–1934	Succeeded by Sir George Stewart Symes
Political offices
Preceded by Sir Samuel Wilson	Permanent Under-Secretary of State for the Colonies; 1933–1937	Succeeded by Sir Cosmo Parkinson
Diplomatic posts
Preceded by New post	UK Representative to Ireland; 1939–1949	Succeeded by Gilbert Laithwaite
Peerage of the United Kingdom
New creation	Baron Rugby; 1947–1969	Succeeded by Alan Loader Maffey
