= Alan Maffey, 2nd Baron Rugby =

British peer (1913-1990)

Alan Loader Maffey, 2nd Baron Rugby (16 April 1913 - 12 January 1990) was a British peer.

== Life ==
Alan Loader Maffey was the son of John Maffey, 1st Baron Rugby, who was Governor-General of the Sudan and a key player in Anglo-Irish relations during World War II. He was educated at Stowe School in Buckinghamshire, England. He fought in the Second World War, gaining the rank of Flight Lieutenant in the Royal Auxiliary Air Force. He married Margaret Bindley, daughter of Harold Bindley, on 14 April 1947. He succeeded as the 2nd Baron Rugby, of Rugby, co. Warwick on 20 April 1969, following the death of his father.

== Personal life ==
Lord Rugby had several children with his wife Margaret Bindley.

- Hon. John Richard Maffey b. 28 Aug 1949, d. 1981
- Rt Hon. Robert Charles Maffey, 3rd Baron Rugby b. 4 May 1951
- Hon. Selina Penelope Maffey b. 15 Nov 1952
- Hon. Christopher Alan Maffey b. 20 Feb 1955
- Hon. Mark Andrew Maffey b. 7 Jun 1956
- Hon. Alicia Dorothy Maffey b. 14 Jan 1960

== Arms of Alan Loader Maffey, 2nd Baron Maffey ==
Coat of arms of Alan Maffey, 2nd Baron Rugby

Crest
A gauntlet fessewise grasping a lantern Proper.
Escutcheon
Ermine a fort with two towers Proper issuant from the base a pile reversed Sable a chief dancettée Or surmounted by a pile Azure charged with an increscent Argent.
Supporters
On either side an Afghan hound Proper gorged with a collar the chain reflexed over the back Or.
Motto
Pass Friend
