= List of cyclists =

This is an incomplete list of professional racing cyclists, sorted alphabetically by decade in which they won their first major race.

== Cyclists by country ==
- (United Kingdom) List of British cyclists
- (Netherlands) List of Dutch cyclists

== Cyclists by decade ==
=== Of the 1880s ===
- Frank Bowden
- Thomas Stevens
- Alfred Tipper
- Thomas Henry Sumpter Walker

=== Of the 1890s ===
- Georgios Aspiotis
- Conn Baker
- Edward Battell
- Hélène Dutrieu
- Léon Flameng
- August von Gödrich
- Bert Harris
- Miltiades Iatrou
- Georgios Koletis
- Aristidis Konstantinidis
- Konstantinos Konstantinou
- Charles "Mile-a-Minute" Murphy was the first man ever to ride a bicycle for one mile in less than a minute. He performed this feat in 1899 by drafting behind a Long Island Rail Road boxcar between Farmingdale and Babylon on Long Island.
- Dora Rinehart
- Major Taylor (26 November 1878 – 21 June 1932) was an American cyclist who won the world 1 mile (1.6 km) track cycling championship in 1899 after setting numerous world records and overcoming racial discrimination. Taylor was the first African-American athlete to achieve the level of world champion and only the second black man to win a world championship—after Canadian boxer George Dixon.
- Frank E. Weaver

=== Of the 1900s ===
- Aloïs Catteau
- Henri Cornet
- Thorvald Ellegaard
- Maurice Garin
- Woody Headspeth
- Marie Marvingt
- Ernest Payne
- Lucien Petit-Breton
- René Pottier

=== Of the 1910s ===
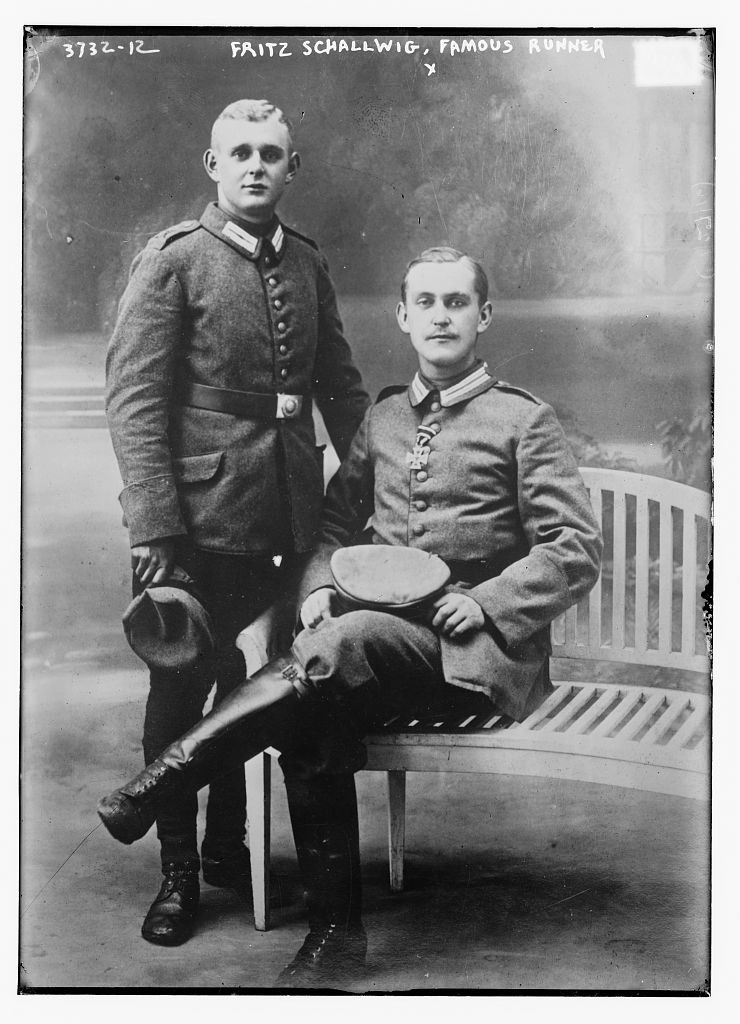
Fritz Schallwig, the German cyclist in 1915–1916

- Jean Alavoine
- Marcel Buysse
- Eugène Christophe
- Oscar Egg
- Frederick Grubb
- Firmin Lambot
- Rudolph "Okey" Lewis
- Henri Pélissier
- Fritz Schallwig (1890–1916), champion German cyclist. He was born on 7 May 1890 in Spandau in Berlin, Germany and was killed in World War I.
- Carl Schutte
- Philippe Thys

=== Of the 1920s ===
- Honoré Barthélémy
- Alfredo Binda
- Ottavio Bottecchia
- Lucien Buysse
- Giovanni Brunero
- Tullio Campagnolo
- Fernand Canteloube
- Gösta Carlsson
- Michael Collins
- Maurice De Waele
- Nicolas Frantz
- Costante Girardengo
- René Hamel
- Hector Heusghem
- Henri Hoevenaers
- Lucien Michard
- Piet Moeskops
- Henri Pélissier
- Léon Scieur
- Félix Sellier
- Frank Southall
- Harry Stenqvist
- Alfonsina Strada

=== Of the 1930s ===
- Gino Bartali
- Charles Holland
- Roger Lapébie
- Leonard Maffei
- Jef Scherens
- Kurt Stöpel
- Lucien Vlaemynck

=== Of the 1940s ===
- Gino Bartali
- Pierre Brambilla
- Fausto Coppi
- Édouard Fachleitner
- Reg Harris
- Guy Lapébie
- Fiorenzo Magni
- André Mahé
- Jacques Marinelli
- Jean Robic
- Briek Schotte
- Gerrit Voorting
- Eileen Sheridan

=== Of the 1950s ===
- Federico Bahamontes
- Ercole Baldini
- Louison Bobet
- Ray Booty
- Fausto Coppi
- Alberto Domínguez
- Wim van Est
- Charly Gaul
- Raphaël Géminiani
- Ted Jorgensen (unicyclist)
- Hugo Koblet
- Ferdy Kübler
- Lucien Lazaridès
- Fiorenzo Magni
- Antonio Maspes
- Stan Ockers
- Rik Van Looy
- Gerrit Voorting
- Roger Walkowiak
- Eileen Sheridan
- Galina Yermolayeva

=== Of the 1960s ===
- Lucien Aimar
- Jacques Anquetil
- Beryl Burton
- Evert Dolman
- Seamus Elliott
- Felice Gimondi
- Barry Hoban
- Jan Janssen
- Jean-Marie Leblanc
- Daniel Morelon
- Raymond Poulidor
- Tom Simpson
- Galina Tsareva
- Michael Wright
- Bart Zoet

=== Of the 1970s ===
- Alf Engers
- Erik De Vlaeminck
- Roger De Vlaeminck
- Gary Fisher
- Cyrille Guimard
- Lutz Heßlich
- Bernard Hinault
- John Howard
- Freddy Maertens
- Eddy Merckx
- Francesco Moser
- Koichi Nakano
- Walter Planckaert
- Jan Raas
- Martín Emilio Rodríguez
- Bernard Thévenet
- Lothar Thoms
- Lucien Van Impe

=== Of the 1980s ===
- Frankie Andreu
- Pedro Delgado
- Laurent Fignon
- Todd Gogulski
- Andrew Hampsten
- Luis Herrera
- Michael Hübner
- Sean Kelly
- Greg LeMond
- Jeannie Longo
- Bob Mionske
- Connie Paraskevin
- Fabio Parra
- Davis Phinney
- Walter Planckaert
- Stephen Roche
- Bob Roll
- Erika Salumäe
- Giuseppe Saronni
- Rebecca Twigg
- Eric Vanderaerden

=== Of the 1990s ===
- Djamolidine Abdoujaparov
- Niki Aebersold
- Frankie Andreu
- Lance Armstrong
- Félicia Ballanger
- Michele Bartoli
- Joseba Beloki
- Chris Boardman
- Johan Bruyneel
- Francesco Casagrande
- Fabio Casartelli
- Ángel Casero
- Mario Cipollini
- Ludo Dierckxsens
- Jens Fiedler
- Fernando Escartín
- Laurent Gané
- Niki Gudex
- Tyler Hamilton
- Roger Hammond
- George Hincapie
- Tristan Hoffman
- Miguel Induráin
- Laurent Jalabert
- Shane Kelly
- Kevin Livingston
- Olaf Ludwig
- Bob Mionske
- Christophe Moreau
- Graeme Obree
- Abraham Olano
- Marco Pantani
- Bjarne Riis
- Fred Rompelberg
- Florian Rousseau
- Marco Serpellini
- Marla Streb
- Rolf Sørensen
- Andrea Tafi
- Pavel Tonkov
- Arnaud Tournant
- Rebecca Twigg
- Jan Ullrich
- Kathy Watt
- Diana Žiliūtė

=== Of the 2000s ===
- Kristin Armstrong
- Lance Armstrong (now stripped of Tour de France medals)
- Judith Arndt
- Emilie Aubry
- Dede Barry
- Ivan Basso
- Grégory Baugé
- Mark Beaumont
- Lyne Bessette
- Paolo Bettini
- Michael Boogerd
- Tom Boonen
- Santiago Botero
- Fabian Cancellara
- Sara Carrigan**
- Mark Cavendish
- Alberto Contador
- Nicole Cooke
- Katheryn Curi
- Gunn-Rita Dahle
- Tom Danielson
- Mike Day
- Ellen van Dijk (NED), multiple road and track world champion
- Alex Dowsett
- Alison Dunlap
- Chris Eatough
- Cadel Evans
- Niki Gudex
- Liz Hatch
- George Hincapie
- Chris Horner
- Chris Hoy
- Thor Hushovd
- Timothy Jones
- Bobby Julich
- Jill Kintner
- Andreas Klöden
- Floyd Landis
- Levi Leipheimer
- Danny MacAskill
- Kaarle McCulloch
- Anna Meares
- Axel Merckx
- Rune Monstad
- Johan Museeuw
- Andris Naudužs
- Manfred Nepp
- Stefan Nimke
- Adrien Niyonshuti
- Stuart O'Grady
- Joseph M. Papp
- Victoria Pendleton
- Taylor Phinney
- Jeremy Powers
- Jennie Reed
- Mark Renshaw
- Donny Robinson
- Peter Sagan
- Andy Schleck
- Fränk Schleck
- Alexandr Shefer
- Marla Streb
- Jan Ullrich
- Sarah Ulmer
- Rigoberto Urán
- Alejandro Valverde
- Tejay van Garderen
- Jonathan Vaughters
- Alexander Vinokourov
- Richard Virenque
- Jens Voigt
- Marianne Vos
- Sam Whittingham
- Bradley Wiggins
- Erik Zabel
- David Zabriskie
- Leontien Zijlaard-Van Moorsel
- Grant Potter

=== Of the 2010s ===
- Julian Alaphilippe
- Roy van den Berg
- Matthijs Büchli
- Chris Froome
- Jeffrey Hoogland
- Harrie Lavreysen
- Filippo Ganna
- François Pervis
- Nairo Quintana
- Primož Roglič
- Geraint Thomas
- Kristina Vogel
- Miriam Welte
- Adam Yates

=== Of the 2020s ===
- João Almeida
- Wout van Aert
- Egan Bernal
- Remco Evenepoel
- Mikhail Iakovlev
- Tadej Pogačar
- Mathieu van der Poel
- Jonas Vingegaard
- Sepp Kuss
- Olav Kooij

== See also ==
- Cycling at the 2008 Summer Olympics
- Former Team CSC staff, from 1998 to present.
- Madonna del Ghisallo, patroness of cyclists.
- Tour of Britain
- Giro d'Italia
- Tour de France
- Vuelta a España
- List of racing cyclists and pacemakers with a cycling-related death
