= Achille Germain =

French cyclist

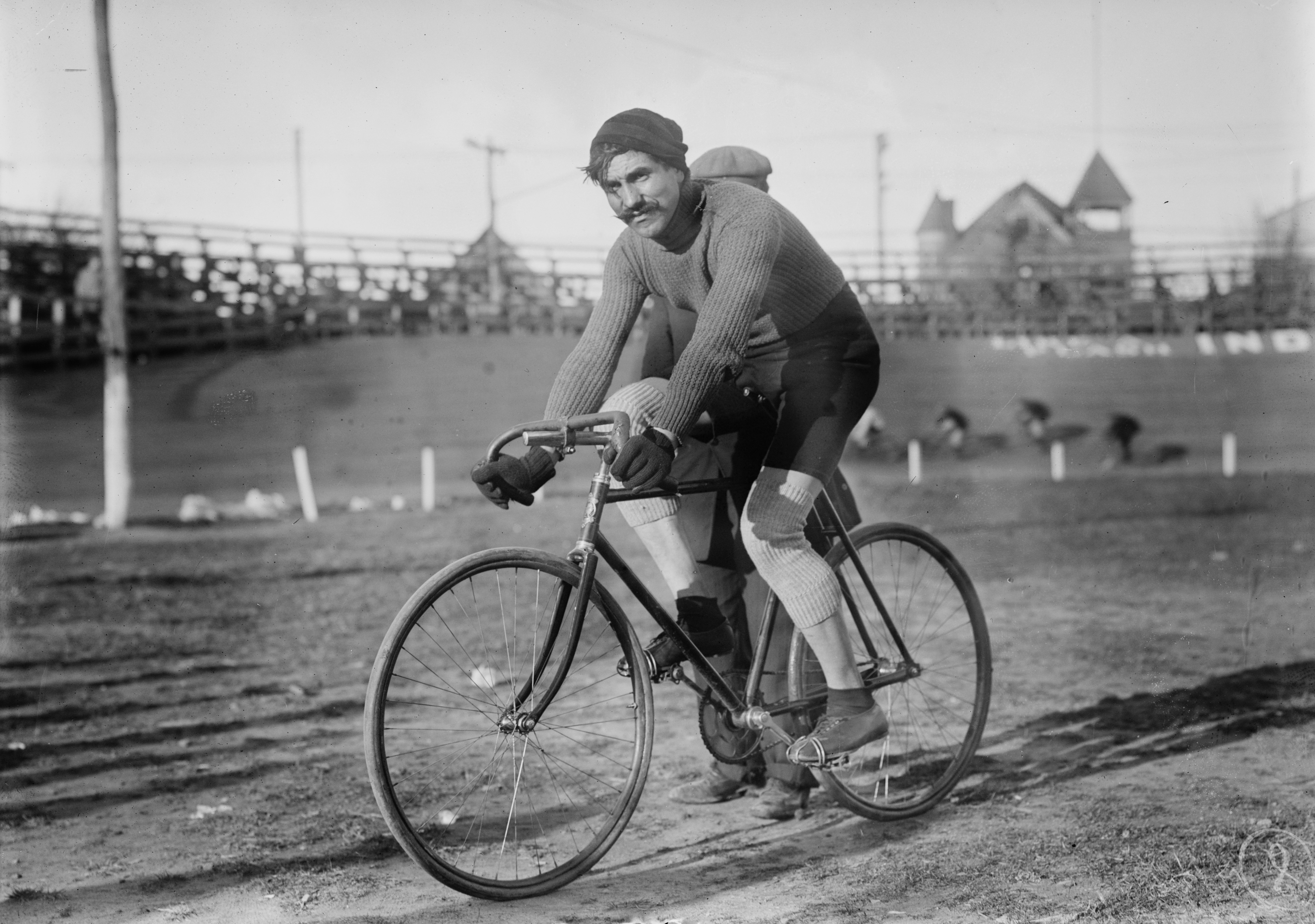
- Achille Germain, November 26, 1910

Personal information
- Born: May 5, 1884 Beaupréau
- Died: April 12, 1938 (aged 53) La Flèche

Cycling career
- Sport: Cycling

Amateur team
- 1903: UV Fléchoise

Professional teams
- 1905–1908: Alcyon
- 1909–1910: individual
- 1911: J.B. Louvet-Dunlop
- 1912–1919: individual

Achille Germain (May 5, 1884 – April 12, 1938) was a French road and track cyclist.

A professional from 1905 to 1919, he won many local events but also shone on the velodromes of Paris, where he gained a great reputation in middle-distance races, notably taking third place in the French championship in 1914. Second in the Six Days of Toulouse in 1906, in partnership with Jean Gauban, he also participated twice in the Six Days of New York and took part in the first Six Days of Paris in 1913.

Germain, nicknamed “Germain de la Flèche” by his followers, also competed in road races, taking part in the 1908 Tour de France, where he placed 16th, achieving his best result with an eighth-place finish on the tenth stage to Bordeaux.

The following year, he won a stage in the Circuit de la Loire and finished second overall.

Mobilized as a corporal cyclist with the 317th Infantry regiment during the First World War, he retired from the sport in 1919 following an injury sustained during the conflict. He retired to La Flèche to run a cycle repair shop and became so involved in local life that he was elected town councilor in his final years.

== Biography ==
=== Early cycling career ===
Achille Germain was born in Beaupréau, Maine-et-Loire, on May 5, 1884, but his family moved to La Flèche, Sarthe, when he was still very young. His beginnings in cycling were fairly modest. He took part in his first races in his adopted town in 1902, at the July 14th races held on the Promenade du Pré. He came second in the bonus race.

The following year, he joined the newly-formed Union vélocipédique fléchoise (UVF), and at the same July 14 meeting, came second in the speed final and third in the bonus race. On September 20, he finished second in the 100-kilometer UVF Cup behind Mareau from Mance, a member of the Union Auto-Cycliste de la Sarthe.

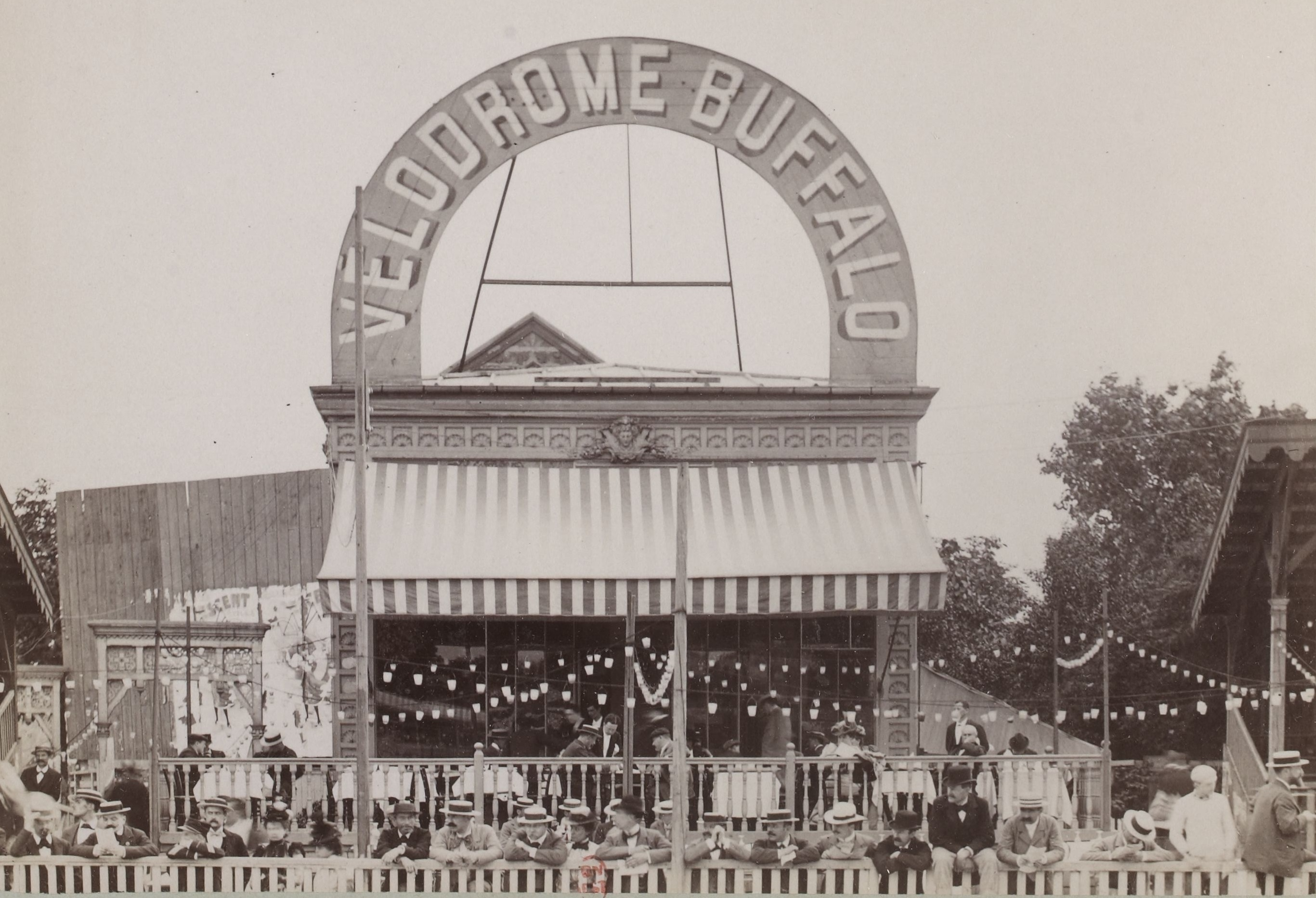
The Buffalo velodrome at the end of the 19th century.

Like many racers of the time, Germain took part in both road and track events. On April 4, 1904, at the opening of the Fléchois velodrome on rue Belleborde, he scored his first victory in the middle-distance race, which he won by half a lap over his rivals. The same day, he reached the final of the sprint race, where he was narrowly beaten by Tubières from Mance. He went on to achieve good results on the Fléchoise track, finishing third in the Sarthe departmental championship and then in the La Flèche championship in June, and fourth in the regional final the following month, an event won by Nantes rider Hardy.

On July 31, Germain scored a prestigious success on the track of the Buffalo Velodrome in Neuilly, clearly dominating the 10-kilometer bonus race. During the event, he won the last five of the ten intermediate sprints, pocketing a ten-franc bonus each time. Back in La Flèche in September, he took second place in the UVF speed championship behind clubmate Albert Leroy, who had just taken part in the Tour de France.

== Professional racer ==
=== A benchmark in track racing (1905–1907) ===
In 1905, Germain, then a third category professional racer, established himself as one of the best cyclists in his region. On the Fléchois velodrome on March 26, he won the speed event, the 45-lap race behind the bike, and the bonus race, a domination he repeated on April 24, when he won the Sarthe departmental speed championship, held on the same track, as well as the 25 km race and the bonus race. At the end of the summer, he scored two further successes, with the Grand Prix de Tours on September 9 and the Grand Prix de Montluçon the following day, both in the middle-distance race. He also distinguished himself in more modest competitions, such as the 4-kilometer cantonal race he won in Verron in early October 5, or at folklore events: the Pinder Circus was visiting La Flèche, and Germain competed with several Fléchois amateurs on the “Canadian track”, a 6.5-meter-diameter construction of wooden rungs spaced ten centimeters apart and inclined at 75 degrees. After an unsuccessful first attempt, he achieved the best performance of the participants, completing eight laps of the track.

During the winter of 1905–1906, Germain trained alongside the best specialists of the day on the Vélodrome d'Hiver track in Paris. Though he could see the gap existing between him and those in the lead, Germain's persistence in training was noticed. Along with Georges Parent, he was chosen to join the coaching team of Henri Cornet, winner of the 1904 Tour de France, in a 50-kilometer tandem match (Note: In middle-distance events, each runner rides behind a human trainer, sometimes in tandem, or on a motorcycle.) against Karl Ingold. Cornet won by nine laps. At the same meeting, Germain made his mark as an individual in the 15-kilometer race behind motorcycles. Third behind Paul Rugère and Anton Jaeck, his offensive behavior throughout the race was praised by the spectators. On February 18, he teamed up with Denmark's Axel Hansen in the American-style Twelve Hours race, in which the two competitors took turns at will. At the end of the race, fourteen teams were still classified in the same lap: victory was therefore decided over six laps between the best sprinters in each team. Hansen initially placed fourth, but the commissaries were slow to validate the results after a crash on the last lap. The race was eventually canceled. On March 4, a meeting was held at the La Flèche Velodrome, bringing together several well-known riders. On his home turf, Germain took third place in the bonus race behind Charles Vanoni and Victor Thuau, before losing out to César Simar, Olympic medalist two years earlier, in the 10-kilometer race behind the bike.

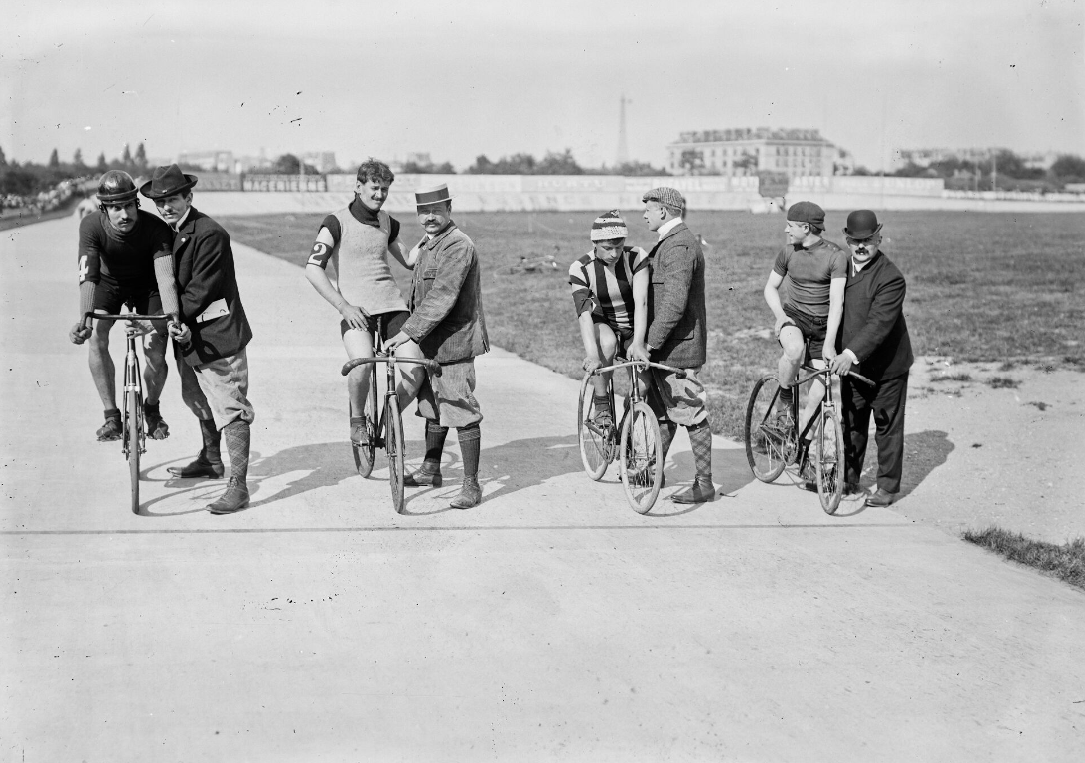
Achille Germain (left) at the start of a race at the Parc des Princes on June 3, 1906.

The outdoor season brought him many successes. On April 23, 1906, in La Flèche, he won the 15-kilometer race behind motorcycles ahead of Arthur Pasquier, then set the track record over 10 kilometers. The following week, in Tours, he won the 50-kilometer race behind motorcycles, again ahead of Pasquier, then shared victory with Jean Gougoltz in the Grand Prix du Conseil Général in Nantes on May 6. His performances attracted the goodwill of the newspaper L'Auto, which had already dubbed him “Germain de la Flèche”: “The middle-distance race went very easily to the Fléchois crack, Germain. This fellow is about to play a major role". On June 3, he discovered the Parc des Princes track and took third place in the 30-kilometer race behind Antoine Dussot and Henri Lautier, which earned him selection by the organizers of the Grand Prix de Paris. Thanks to the financial support of Viscount de Lesseville, head of the Union Vélocipédique Fléchoise, he was able to employ several trainers to compete in the one-hour race behind tandems. Competing against two of the best cyclists of the time, Henri Cornet and René Pottier, he was soundly beaten, but as with every one of his outings, his attitude was widely praised by the specialists, and Germain became one of the public's most popular riders. At the beginning of July, at the Vélodrome Buffalo, he failed in his attempt to beat the world record for 10 kilometers without trainers, held by Lucien Petit-Breton, but a few days later he scored a clear success over 15 kilometers behind motorcycles on the same track. On July 15, in La Flèche, in front of an enthusiastic crowd, he won two of the three events organized and took the overall victory. At the end of August, he was the only rider to hold off César Simar over 30 kilometers at Le Buffalo, then clearly dominated Émile Bouhours over the same distance at Tours in early September.

Germain then took part in the Six Jours de Toulouse, the first race of its kind in Europe, held on the Bazacle velodrome, where he teamed up with local rider Jean Gauban. The duo achieved a promising second place, second only to brothers Émile and Léon Georget. Throughout the event, the Fléchois rider was extremely active, winning numerous prizes, including those for the 47th and 49th hours. On his return, he was triumphantly welcomed back to La Flèche. A few days later, he was sent to Toul barracks, where he was to perform his military service with the 153rd infantry regiment.

Germain was rarely granted leave, but managed to take part in a few races in 1907: beaten by Arthur Pasquier over 40 kilometers in Tours on April 21, he took his revenge and beat him the following week in La Flèche at the Grand Prix du Printemps.

=== Participation in the Tour de France (1908) ===
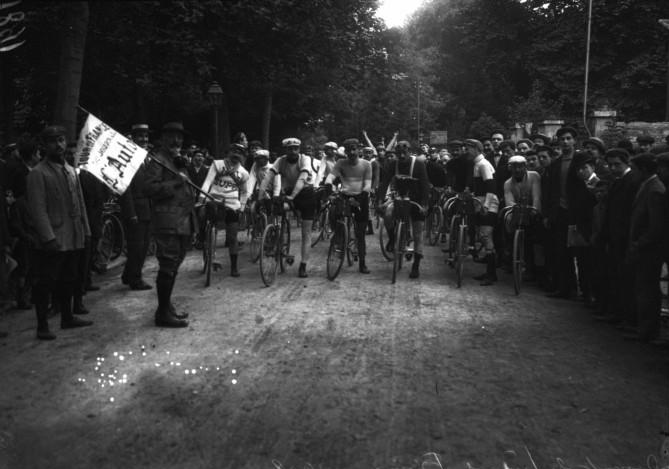
The start of the 1908 Tour de France.

Released from military service on March 1, 1908, Achille Germain wanted to take part in more road races: he considered taking part in Paris–Roubaix, but eventually had to give up18. On the velodrome track in La Flèche, in early April, he won the Sarthe speed championship, then finished second to Pasquier in the Grand Prix du Printemps. In May, on the same track, he won a 12-hour race by a clear 16-lap margin over his nearest rival. A few days later, he came second in the 40-kilometer Grand Prix d'Angers with trainers and announced his entry in the Tour de France. It was the only Tour he contested during his career.

He had a difficult start to the race: at best, he finished 22nd on the fifth stage from Lyon to Grenoble and was 25th overall on the evening of the sixth stage to Nice. However, race conditions were very tough at the start of the Tour, and only 45 of the 114 entries were still in contention. He went on to achieve some convincing results: 19th in Nîmes and 15th in Toulouse, 17th in Bayonne, and 8th in Bordeaux, having been among the frontrunners throughout the race. Germain finished the Tour de France with three 12th places and one 14th. In the end, he came 16th with 236 points, 200 behind the winner Lucien Petit-Breton. (Note: At that time, the general classification was determined by points, by adding up the places obtained in the stages, and not by race time.) This encouraging participation earned him the congratulations of many specialists, such as L'Auto journalist Charles Ravaud, who considered him capable of achieving excellent results if he chose to devote himself even more to the road. His participation in the Grande Boucle further boosted his popularity: he was carried in triumph on his return to La Flèche station and welcomed into town by over 2,000 people.

=== Success on the Road and Six Days of New York (1909) ===
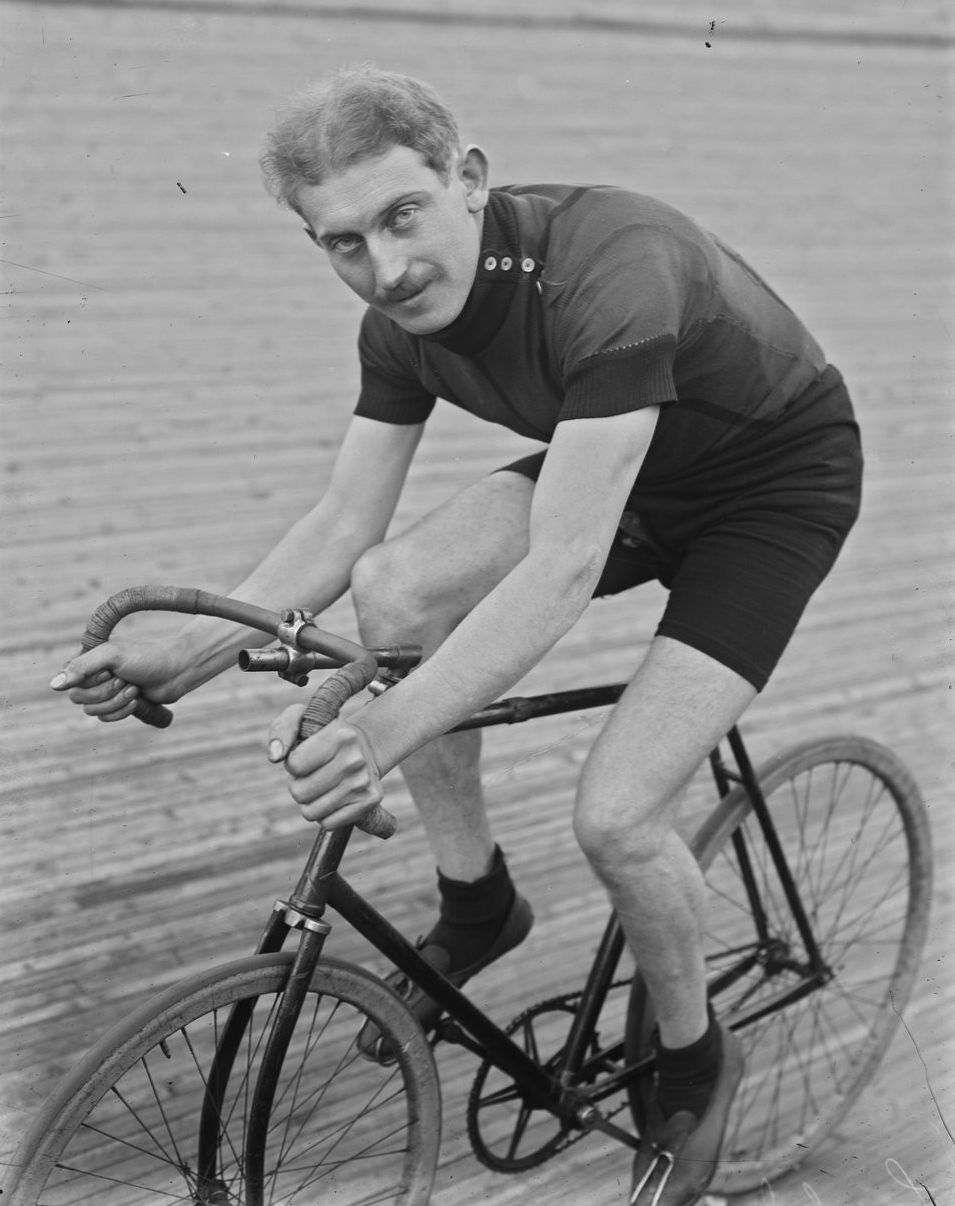
Daniel Lavalade, who beat Achille Germain in a middle-distance race in Angers in 1909.

Resting during the winter, he made his comeback on April 25, 1909, at the La Flèche velodrome and retained his Sarthe speed champion title. Beaten in Angers by Daniel Lavalade over 40 kilometers behind motorcycles, he distinguished himself at the end of May by taking second place in the Circuit de la Loire road race, run over two stages, having won the first in Loudun. Invited to take part in the eighth stage of the Wolber Grand Prix, organized by Peugeot on June 13 between Paris and La Flèche, Germain placed sixth and, according to L'Auto, earned “his stripes as a great road racer”. He was also invited to take part in the ninth stage to Nantes, where he finished fourth before being downgraded for a course error.

During the summer, he opted out of the Tour de France to compete in a series of lucrative track races. Forced to retire from a 24-hour race in Marseille, he teamed up with Bouteiller for a 12-hour race in Toulouse, taking second place after a hard-fought battle with Jean-Baptiste Dortignacq. In September, he was one of the main favorites for the Bol d'or, held on the track of the Buffalo velodrome. In the lead after the first four hours of the race, run without trainers, he suffered a serious setback and lost contact: he was only in seventh and last place after seven hours. In the last quarter of the race, Germain overtook two rivals and finally finished fifth with a total of 681.6 kilometers, a long way from three-time winner Léon Georget.

Germain made his return to the road at the end of September with Paris–Tours. His eighteenth-place finish was anecdotal, just as his last few outings on the track were hardly conclusive: he failed twice in his attempt to set the record for the hour without a trainer at La Flèche. In early December, however, he was selected for the Six Days of New York, one of the world's most famous races, where he teamed up with British runner Reginald Shirley. In the 50th minute of the race, Shirley caused a heavy crash when he passed the baton to Germain, who was hit in the right leg. The duo conceded a lap to the other teams, and despite Germain's best efforts, were unable to catch up. At the end of the first day of racing, Shirley retired, suffering from stomach pains. Germain was joined by the Italian Egisto Carapezzi, whose partner had also been forced to withdraw. By the regulations, the new crew received a one-lap penalty, but this was nothing compared to the number of laps Carapezzi regularly conceded during his stints. The duo were 21 laps down after 34 hours of racing. Redoubling their efforts to overcome the deficit, the two men suffered a breakdown at the same time and interrupted their race for two hours. At the end of the fifth day, Carapezzi gave up, and despite Germain's desire to continue the race, the judges deemed him too retarded to continue, his deficit having risen to almost 900 laps.

=== Middle-distance specialist (1910–1913) ===
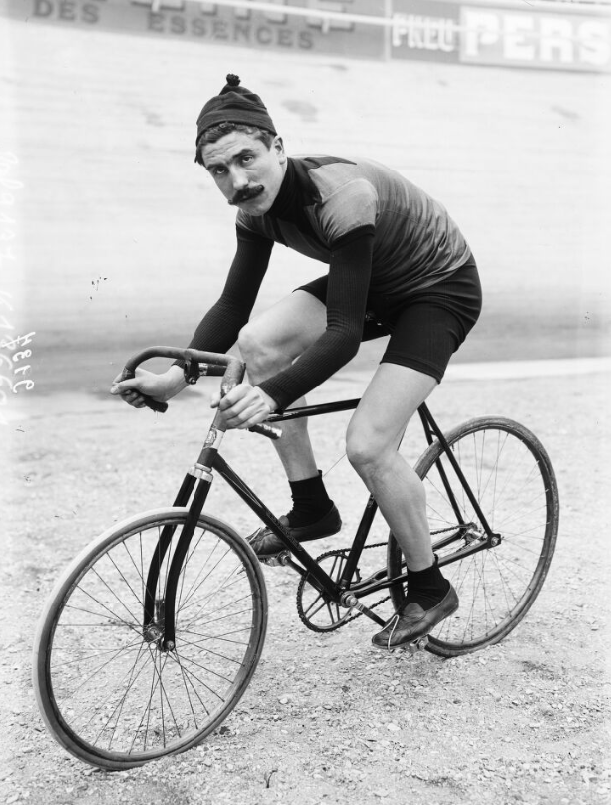
Achille Germain in 1910.

At the beginning of 1910, Germain once again gave priority to the track. He obtained convincing results at the local level but struggled to confirm his performance in the major Parisian events. In May, however, he competed in the French road championships with coaches. Dropped after the first few kilometers, he eventually came tenth. After a detour to the track and a success in Brest over 25 kilometers at the expense of César Simar, he returned to the road to take tenth place in Paris-Le Mans. During the summer, Germain took several places of honor on the velodromes, coming second in the Grand Prix d'inauguration du vélodrome d'Angers, the Challenge Cointreau in the same town, and the Huit heures de Tours, which earned him selection for the Bol d'or. Ill and suffering from the pace set by Léon Georget, he retired shortly after the halfway mark. As in the previous year, he was selected to take part in the Six Days of New York, this time in partnership with the Belgian Verlinden. The two men never found their rhythm and retired after just eight hours of racing.

In 1911, Germain opened a repair shop in La Flèche for bicycles of all makes. At the same time, the J.B. Louvet team hired him to race on the road, but after his withdrawal from Paris-Tours, he gave up on Paris-Roubaix, preferring to take part in a track event in Angers. Germain also became a race organizer, setting up the Grand Prix Jean-Baptiste Louvet in La Flèche on May 7. The 130-kilometer road race, open only to members of the Union velocipédique de France, crisscrossed the region's roads, passing through Le Lude and Baugé.

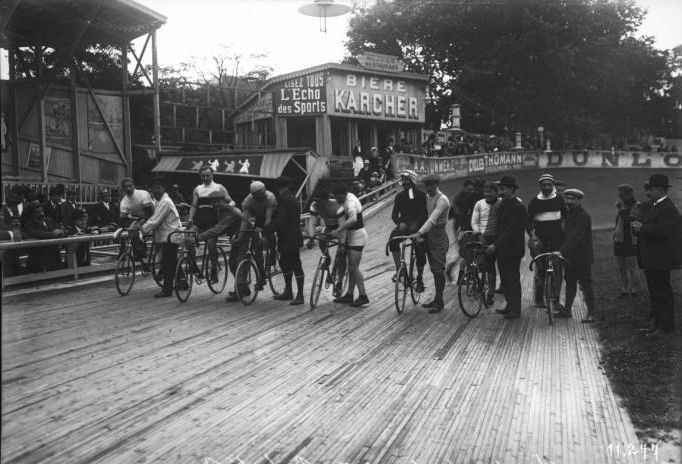
The start of the Bol d'Or in 1910.

After several middle-distance successes in Angers and Nantes, notably at the expense of American Woody Headspeth, he returned to the road for Paris-Brest-Paris in the road-tourist category. A crash before Rennes destroyed his bike, and Germain had to walk the 14 kilometers to the city. Unable to repair it, he gave up. His winter season began with several places of honor, but it was on December 17, at the Vélodrome d'Hiver, that he won a convincing victory in the Prix Robl, a middle-distance race run over 25 kilometers and organized in tribute to the German champion Thaddäus Robl, who died in a plane crash. Germain not only raced for his account but also regularly acted as a trainer for other riders, as in the Prix de Madison Square at the beginning of the following January, in which American Joe Fogler owed his victory in part to him.

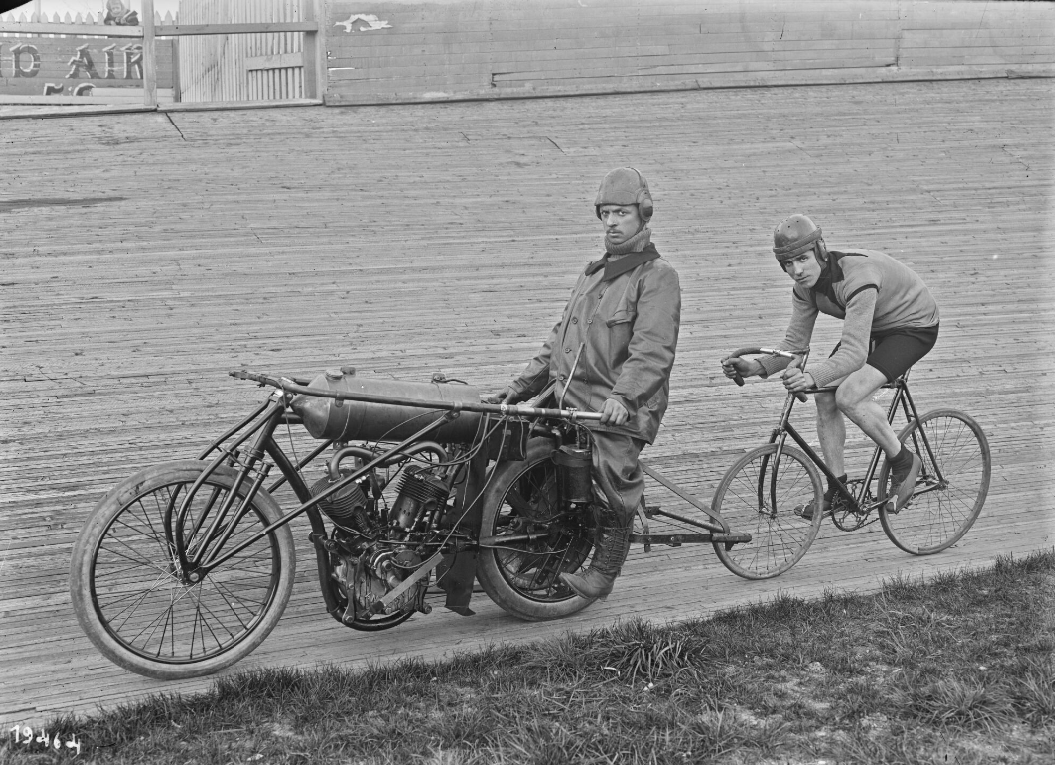
Achille Germain in 1912, behind a motorcycle coach.

During the 1912 season, Germain concentrated mainly on middle-distance running. He racked up successes in Rouen, Paris, and Angers, usually against second-rate opponents. On June 9, on the Parc des Princes track, he took fourth place in the French middle-distance championship, running over 100 kilometers, finishing fifteen laps behind the winner Paul Guignard and seven off the podium. A week later, in Nantes, he finally beat worthy rivals Émile Bouhours and César Simar in a 50-kilometer race. In August, he came third in the Critérium de demi-fond at Le Buffalo, then won the Le Mans meeting on the Jacobins Velodrome. On September 15, he suffered a severe setback in the Grand Prix de France de Vitesse at the Parc des Princes, failing in the heats, but returned to the limelight at the end of the year with a convincing victory in the Prix Stocks, run over 40 kilometers at the Vélodrome d'Hiver. Danish rider Herman Kjeldsen was the only rider to stand up to him in this event, but Germain was the strongest and displayed a radiant form that earned him selection for the first Six Jours de Paris, on January 13, 1913.

On the Vél d'Hiv track, during the first two days, Germain, in partnership with Édouard Léonard, animated the race by consistently leading the pack, but the two riders began to lose contact after the 50th hour of the race. The duo finished ninth, six laps behind the winners, but Germain and Léonard were among the race's top prizewinners. After the race, Germain's popularity soared once again, enabling him to negotiate higher participation rates at various velodrome meetings. After successes in Angers in March, he made a strong impression on April 13, winning a 30-kilometer race ahead of Daniel Lavalade and César Simar at the Buffalo. A journalist from L'Auto declared: "The middle-distance race has returned to the runner with courage personified. My name is Achille Germain." Considered an outsider for the French middle-distance championship, he took fourth place, a long way behind the winner Paul Guignard. At the Grand Prix de Paris, he came second in the 50-kilometer race, well ahead of Georges Sérès, but containing the return of several well-known runners. He concluded the season with another place of honor, finishing second in the Grand Prix de clôture de Roubaix.

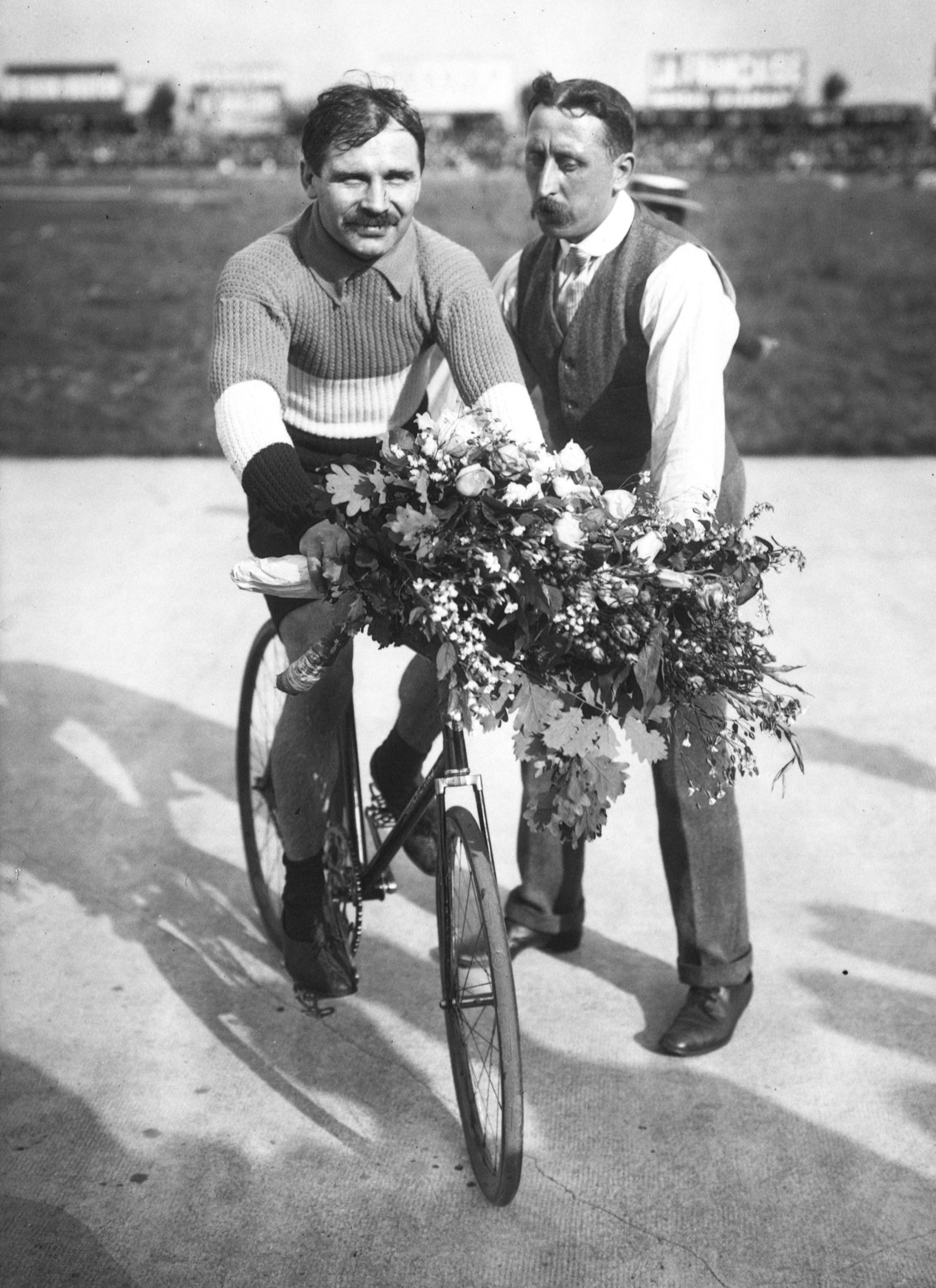
Paul Guignard, French middle-distance champion.

As in the previous year, Germain teamed up with Édouard Léonard for the Six Jours de Paris, which started on January 12, 1914. After Léonard dropped out on the second day of the race, Germain teamed up with Charles Meurger and came within two laps of the leaders. Le Fléchois kept the duo afloat, but Meurger, more of a sprint specialist, conceded several laps and eventually retired after the 61st hour. Germain continued the race with a third team-mate, Alfred Beyl, but it was he who finally retired after 102 hours, having won numerous primes. After a series of fine performances at the Paris meetings and a major success at the Grand Prix du Printemps de Limoges, he achieved the best result of his career at the French middle-distance championship on July 19, finishing third in the event, won once again by Paul Guignard.

=== World War I and end of career (1914–1919) ===
A few days later, the First World War broke out and, like his competitors, Germain was mobilized. Assigned to the 317th Infantry Regiment as a corporal cyclist, he was in charge of transporting mail by bicycle. During the war, however, he took part in several races on leave. On November 19, 1916, he took part in a 400-lap American-style race at the Vélodrome d'Hiver. Teaming up with Marius Chocque, he came tenth. In December 1917, on the same track, he won the Prix de la Capitale over 30 kilometers, and the following year he won the Prix d'Avril middle-distance race at the Vel' d'Hiv'. He then beat a Belgian runner in a middle-distance match held at the Beaulieu velodrome in Le Mans.

Demobilized at the beginning of 1919, Germain returned to racing more intensively. Third in the one-hour Trophée de Paris in May, he won the Grand Handicap de demi-fond at the Parc des Princes on July 6. Although he seemed to be in full possession of his powers, he had to put an end to his career because of a groin injury, contracted during the war, which eventually reopened.

=== Reconversion and end of life ===
Germain then retired to La Flèche to run his cycle repair shop. Very involved in local life, he invited his friend Robert Spears, world track speed champion, to lay a wreath at the cemetery to commemorate the Armistice on November 11, 1920. In 1922, to pay tribute to the veterans of the Great War, he inaugurated a commemorative plaque on the birthplace of Fléchois aviator Charles Godefroy, made famous by his flight under the Arc de Triomphe in Paris on August 7, 1919. Two years later, a Poilus banquet was organized on his initiative in the ballroom of the Hôtel du Cheval Blanc. On this occasion, he donated one of his racing bicycles, and offered to the winner of a tombola organized for the benefit of the veterans. Germain was elected vice-chairman of the town's Comité des Fêtes in March 1926.

But he didn't give up cycling. In 1920, he took on the role of motorcycle coach to Tunisian Ali Neffati, and in the same year, together with his friends, set up a new multi-sports club, "La Flèche-Sportive". Among other achievements, this club organized a road race, Paris-La Flèche, which ran for three consecutive editions. At the same time, Germain was involved in the construction of a new stadium and velodrome to replace Belleborde. After several months of negotiation, work began on a plot of land adjacent to the Route d'Angers: the stadium was inaugurated in November 1921 for a soccer match, while the track was built in early 1922 thanks to the financial support of several great champions, including Robert Spears, Oscar Egg, Maurice Brocco, aviator Georges Kirsch and boxer Georges Carpentier. In 1925, Germain set up the Printania restaurant and dance hall opposite the new stadium, which quickly became one of the city's most popular entertainment venues.

In April 1931, he stood as an Independent Republican candidate in the municipal by-elections in La Flèche. Obtaining 1,111 votes, the highest total, he was among the five newly elected. He also ran in the 1932 legislative elections. With 4,108 votes, he came third, more than 5,600 votes behind the incumbent Radical candidate Jean Montigny, who was elected in the first round.

Re-elected to the La Flèche town council in 1935, still as an independent, he served until his death on April 12, 1938, at the age of 54. He is buried in the Saint-Thomas cemetery. On May 22, 1978, the town of La Flèche paid tribute to him by naming the street of a newly built housing estate after him.

== Awards ==
=== On the track ===
Throughout his career, Germain won numerous victories in races of varying importance organized by different velodromes. Only his most notable results are listed here.

- 1906
  - 2nd Six Jours de Toulouse (with Jean Gauban)
- 1914
  - 3rd French National Stayers Championship

=== On the road ===
- 1908
  - 16th in the Tour de France
- 1909
  - Sarthe Championship
  - Loire Circuit
    - Stage 1
    - 2nd overall

== See also ==
- French National Stayers Championships
- Thaddäus Robl

== Bibliography ==
- Weecxsteen, Pierre (1991). On l'appelait Germain de La Flèche. Cahiers Fléchois.
- Potron, Daniel (1999). Le xxe siècle à La Flèche: Première période: 1900–1944. La Flèche. ISBN 2-9507738-2-6.
