= Nepp =

Nepp is a German surname. Notable people with the surname include:

- Dominik Nepp (born 1982), Austrian politician
- Manfred Nepp, German cyclist
- Uwe Nepp (born 1966), German cyclist
