= Gudex =

Gudex is a surname. Notable people with the surname include:

- Niki Gudex, Australian mountain biker
- Rick Gudex (1968–2016), American politician
