= Conn Baker =

American cyclist and painter (1870–1944)

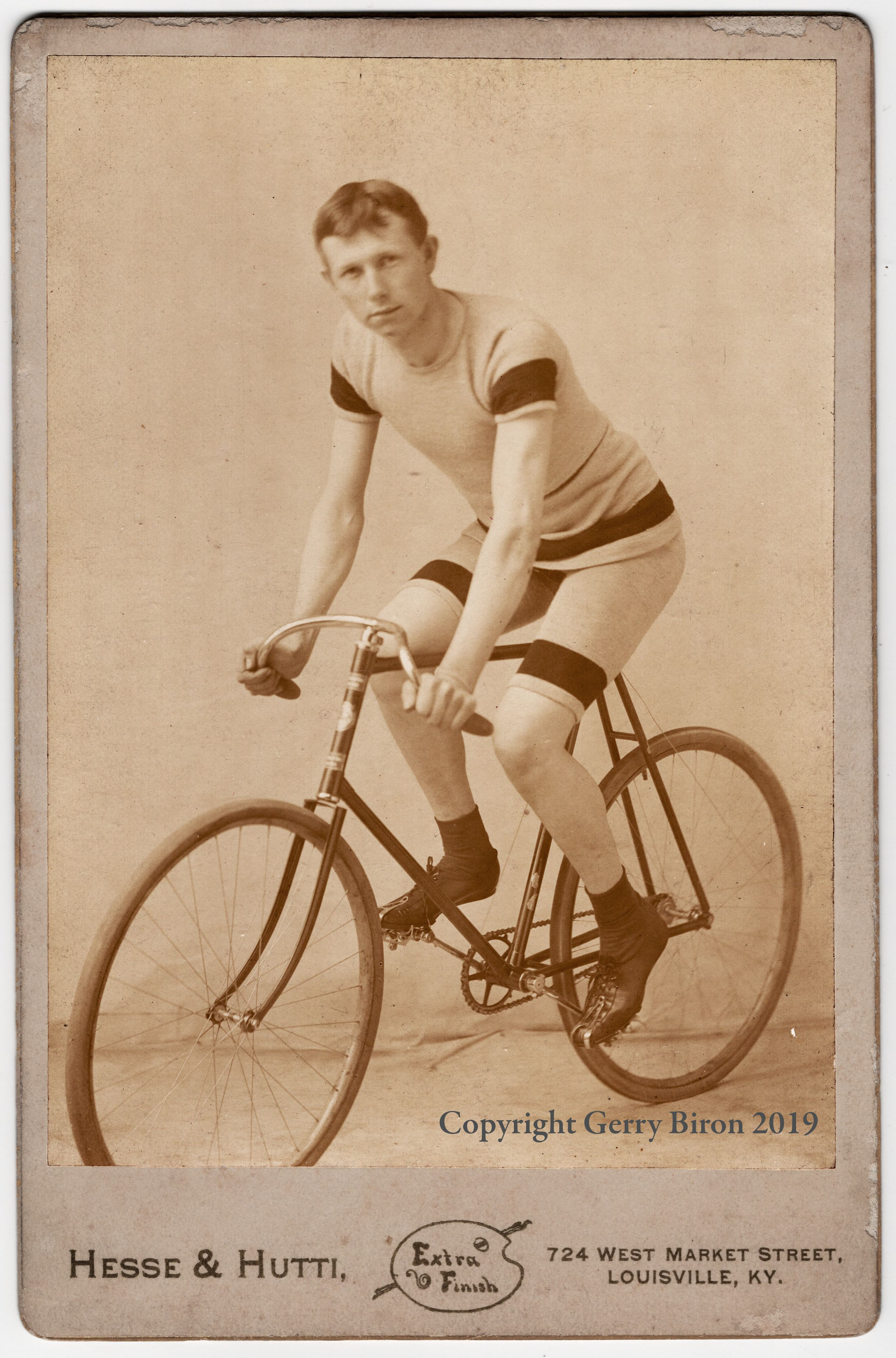

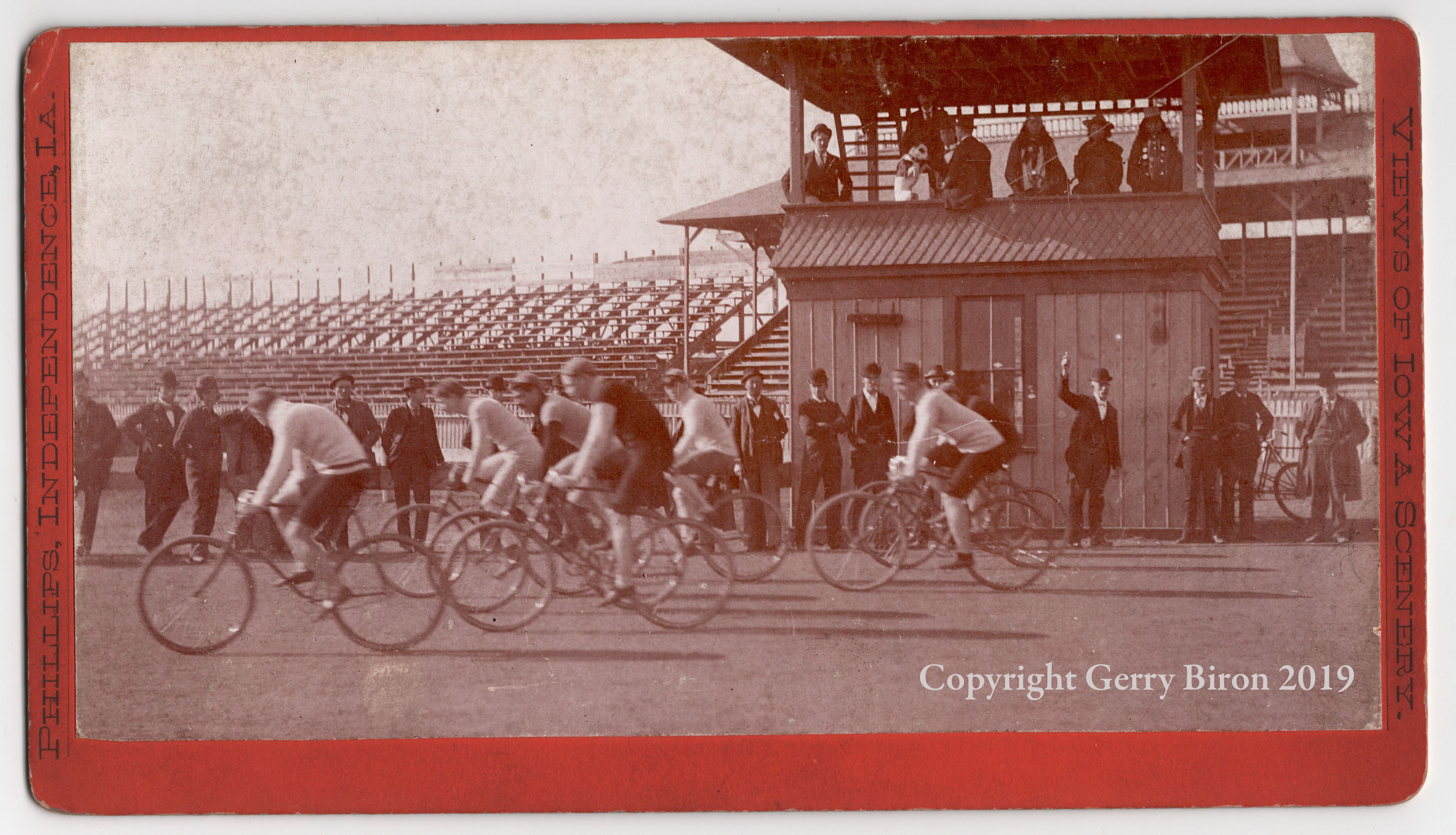

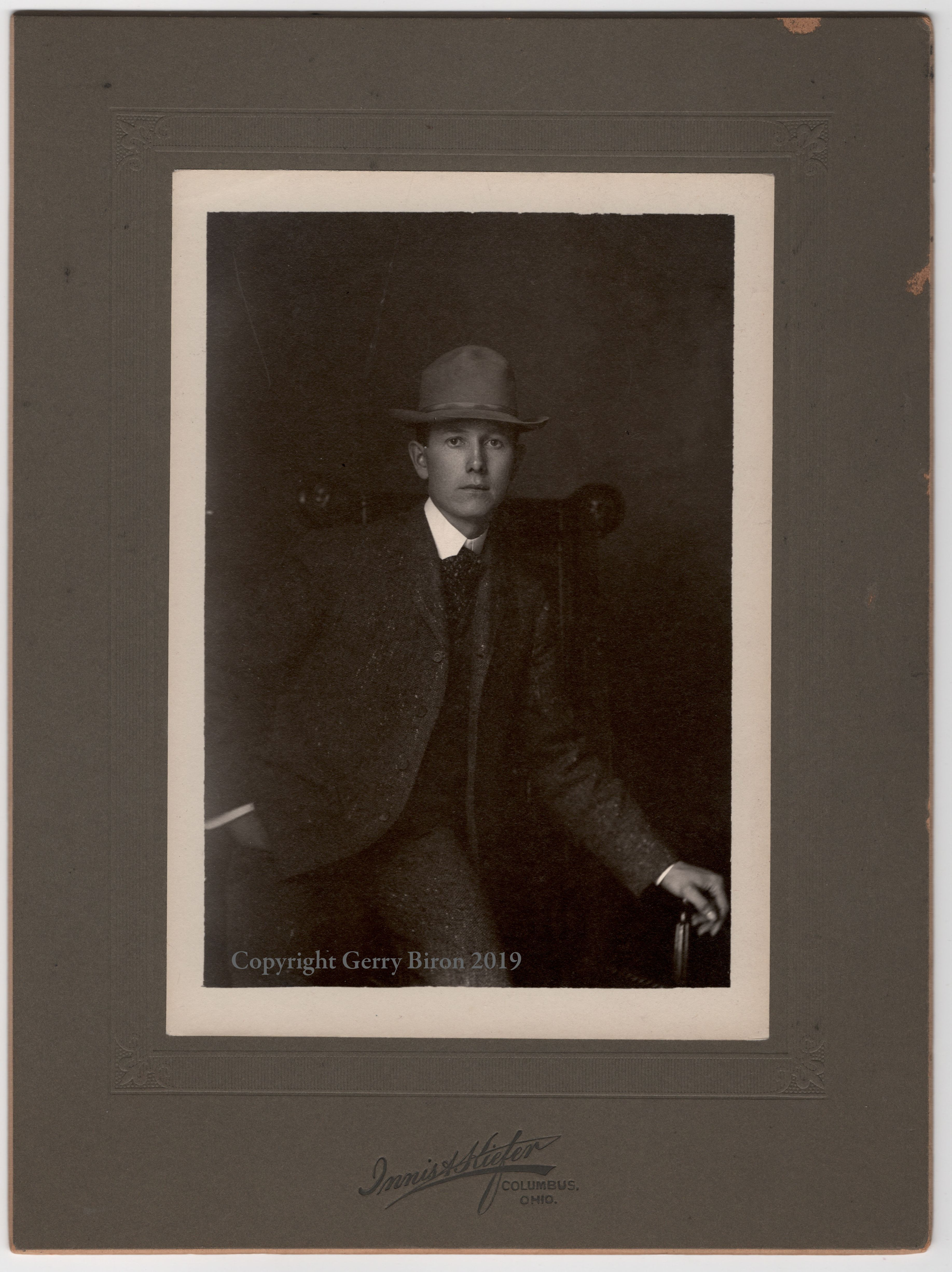

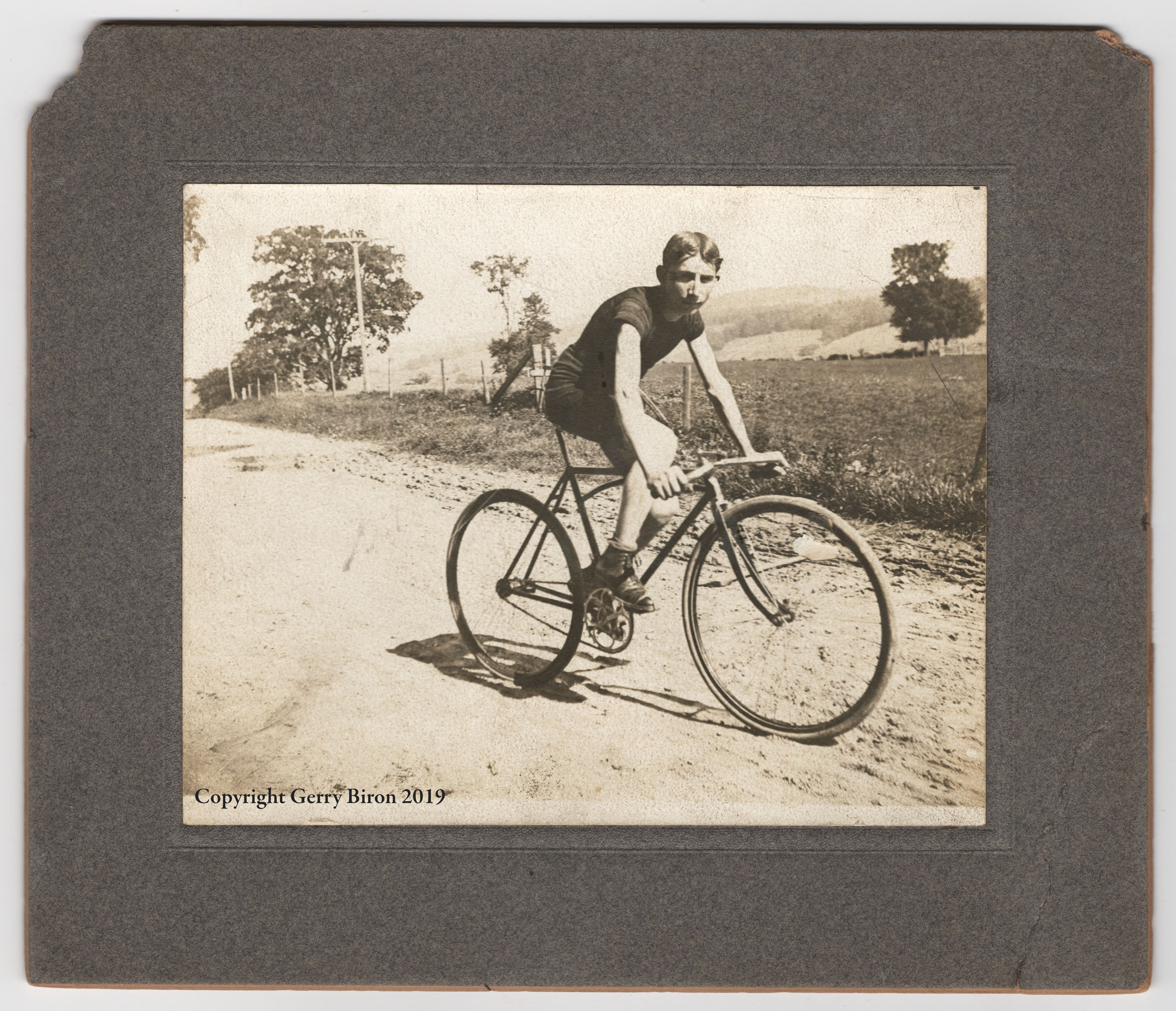

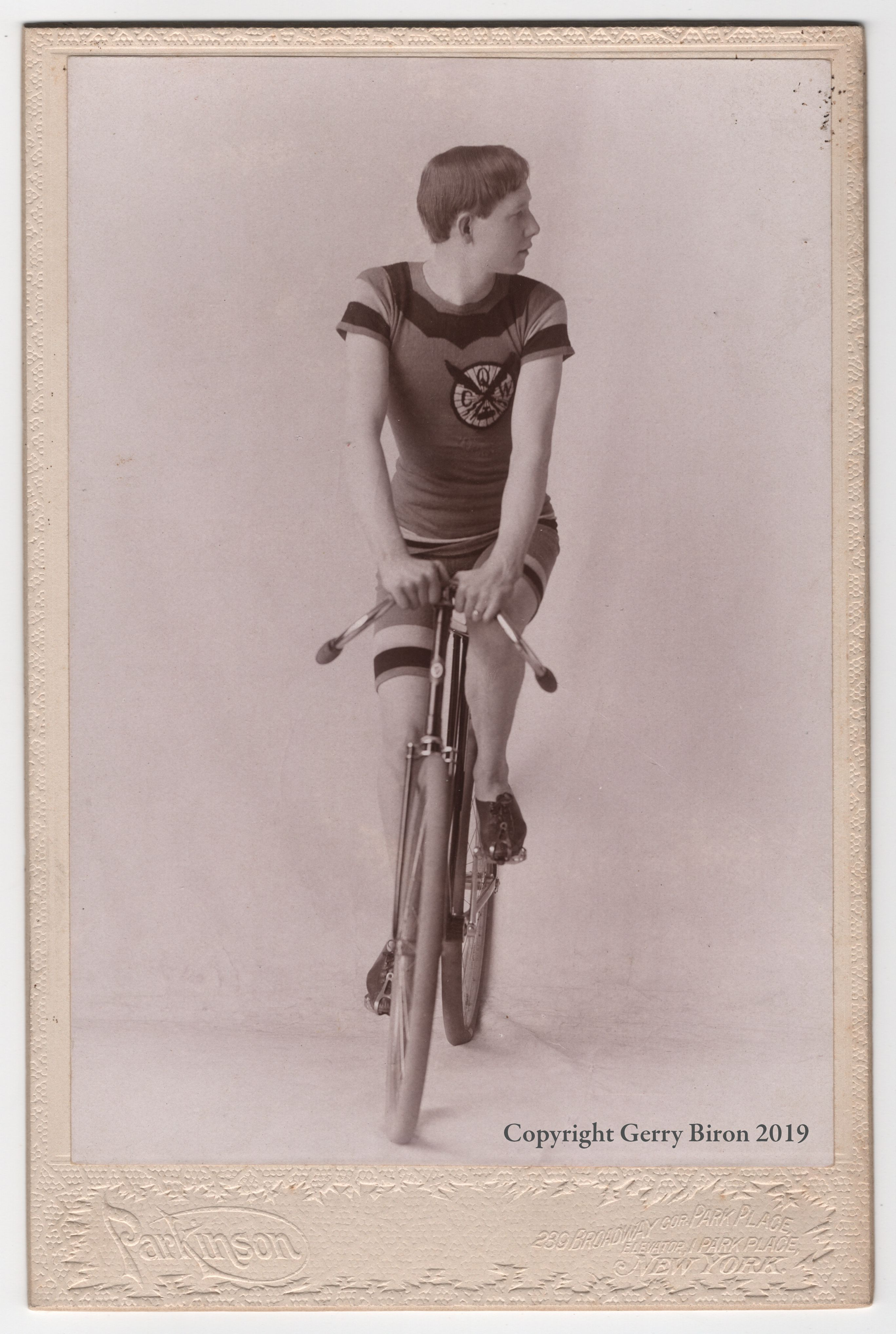

John Carter "Conn" Baker January 31, 1870 – October 8, 1944) was a cyclist and landscape painter. He raced and was a stunt and trick rider. Baker was a trick cyclist with the Forepaugh and Sells Circus. He joined it in 1901. He rode a safety bicycle. He held world records for speed and endurance.

== Biography ==
He was the son of Burr and Jenny Carter Baker. He was bicycle racer from his teenage years and held several world records for speed and endurance. A daredevil, he performed tricks and stunts. Using a safety bicycle, he was the performed "loop-the-loops".

In 1898 he stopped racing and took up art. He returned to trick riding performances. Conner joined the Forepaugh and Sells Circus in 1901. He performed using the pseudonym J. C. Carter and "Allo, Diavolo!" wearing a devil costume.

He toured including in Asia where he met his wife Laura Calvert, a member of the Tiller Girls, who he married in 1908. They had a daughter.

His log cabin home is in Franklin County, Ohio. After retiring from circus performing, he focused on his landscape painting. An active Republican, he worked for the State of Ohio Auditor's office and served as the commissioner of the Franklin County Liquor Licensing Board. He and his wife had one daughter, Miriam Poona Gibney. Author and artist Conn Baker Gibney is their grandson.

In 1917 he was part of a group that opened a track in Columbus.
