= Leonard Maffei =

American cyclist

- Leonardo E. Marzigliano, aka Leonard Maffei

Personal information
- Born: Leonardo E. Marzigliano Providence, Rhode Island, U.S.
- Died: 1989

Cycling career
- Sport: Cycling

Leonard Maffei (died 1989) was a champion bicycle racer in the United States during the 1930s. Born Leonardo E. Marzigliano in Providence, Rhode Island, he raced under his mother's maiden name because his own name was too long to fit on a jersey.

== Biography ==
Leonard Maffei (second from left) with his crew of relatives and friends in 1936

Based in Brooklyn, New York, Maffei raced throughout the Northeast during the heyday of American bicycle racing in venues like Madison Square Garden and the Coney Island Velodrome. He won the New York state championship three times, in 1933's Junior division and the Senior title in 1936 and 1937. Leonard's accomplishments also include riding an antique bicycle (used by Charles M. "Mile a Minute" Murphy in 1899 to ride a measured mile in under 60 seconds) on national television.

In 1936, Leonard won the New York State championship race, but found himself without a way to reach the national championships which were held in St. Louis, Missouri that year. His uncle Damiano Maffei (affectionately known as Uncle Mimi), procured a car by having his brothers and friends contribute towards the expenses in exchange for passage on the trip. Unfortunately, it took so many men to fund the trip that there was no room for Leonard in the small car. Billing his solution as "training", Uncle Mimi had Leonard pedal behind the car on his bicycle from Brooklyn to St. Louis. The 950 mile trip left him so physically exhausted that he lost the race.

An extremely accident prone Leonard survived the Spanish Influenza outbreak of 1918, a household fire, a gas leak, and numerous incidents of falls and car strikes while riding his bicycle, both on and off the competitive track. His most severe injury occurred on July 14, 1962 at the Fair Oaks Velodrome near Middletown, New York. Leonard fell heavy during the seniors race and was inadvertently run over by some of the other riders. He suffered a broken neckbone, shoulder bone, collar bone, and five ribs.

Outside of racing, Leonard worked as a ship painter in the Brooklyn Navy Yard, and painted apartments in the famed Stuyvesant Town and Peter Cooper Village housing developments in Manhattan. In his later years, he served as a housesitter and airport driver for affluent retirees in Fort Lauderdale, Florida. A prolific athlete who rode 20 miles a day well into his 70s, he died of stomach cancer in 1989.
