= Thomas Henry Sumpter Walker =

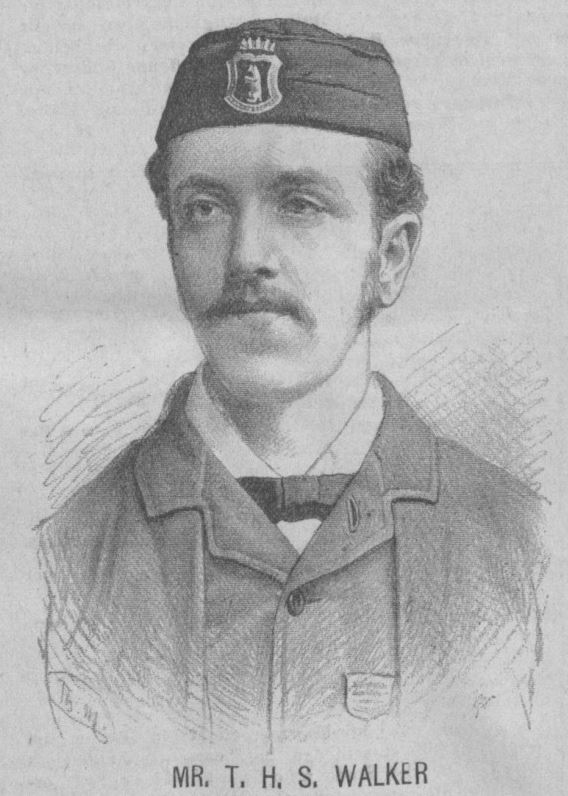
Portrait of Thomas Henry Sumpter Walker

Thomas Henry Sumpter Walker aka T. H. S. Walker, (*29 June 1856 in Cambridge; † 1 May 1936) was an English bicycle racing pioneer who lived and worked for decades in Germany.

== Early life ==
Thomas Walker bought his first bicycle in 1868. From 1869 until 1872 he attended the Rugby School. In 1873 he moved to Bad Godesberg in Germany.

== Career ==
Having obtained his school certificate he left Germany to join the 22nd Middlesex Rifle Volunteer Corps. After having served his time he got hired by the Howe Machine Company. Among other products this firm manufactured bicycles. As a representative he returned to Germany. Eventually he represented in Berlin also St. George's Engineering, Rudge-Whitworth and Quadrant Tricycle. The year 1882 marked the beginning of his career as a sportsman. As an amateur he competed in several international bicycle races, including events in Prague, London and throughout Germany. Based on his reputation he was chosen to organise meetings and races. As his achievements were increasingly recognised he also put up national championships and represented the German cyclist internationally. Also he created the first German publication for organised cyclist, which started as Das Velociped and was later continued as Der Radfahrer. Moreover, he published a variety of leaflets and books including George Lacy Hillier's The Art of Cycle Racing which got released in English, German and French.

== Later life ==
In 1889, at the age of 34, Walker finished his commitment because he was tired of the permanent quarreling among German cyclists. Disappointed by the fact that he'd encountered xenophobic attitudes he dropped his plan to become a German citizen and left Germany for good. For a certain time he lived in Bristol. Later he moved to London. In September 1936 The London Gazette published an advertisement by a solicitor from London who hereby tried to find relatives of the deceased.

== Biography ==
- Rabenstein, Rüdiger (1995). Cycle History. San Francisco: Robert van der Plas. ISBN 0-933201-72-9.
