= Fritz Schallwig =

German cyclist

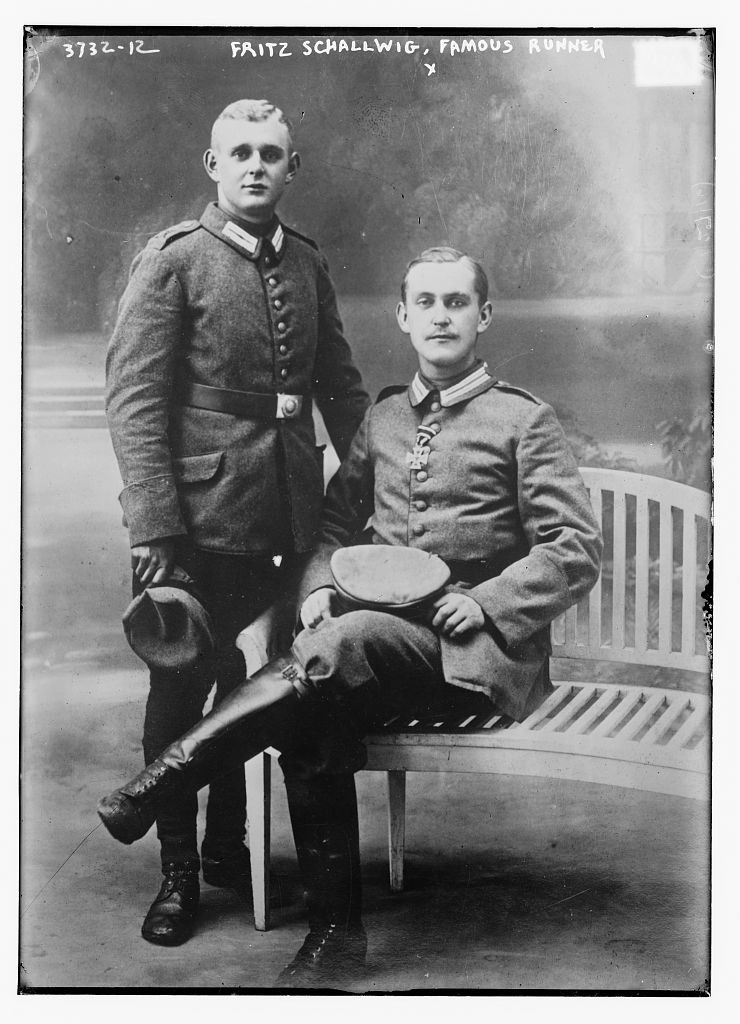
- Fritz Schallwig in 1915-16

Personal information
- Full name: Fritz Schallwig
- Born: 7 May 1890 Spandau, German Empire
- Died: 1960 Hamburg, West Germany

Cycling career
- Sport: Cycling
- Disciplines: Road and track
- Role: Rider
- Rider type: Long distance / Six days

Major wins
- Berlin - Leipzig - Berlin (1910), Berlin - Cottbus - Berlin (1911), Rund um Magdeburg (1911), Nürnberg–München–Nürnberg (1921)

Fritz Schallwig (7 May 1890 – 1960) was a champion German cyclist.

== Biography ==
He was born on 7 May 1890, in Spandau in Berlin, Germany.

He won his first race in 1910 in Germany in the Berlin to Leipzig race.

During World War I he was awarded the Iron Cross.

In 1921 he won the Nuremberg to Munich race.
