= Axel Hansen (cyclist) =

Danish cyclist

Personal information
- Born: 13 October 1899 Amiens, France
- Died: 28 January 1933 (aged 33) Lyngby-Taarbæk, Denmark

Cycling career
- Sport: Cycling

Axel Hansen (13 October 1899 – 28 January 1933) was a Danish cyclist. He competed in two events at the 1920 Summer Olympics.
