= Rune Monstad =

Norwegian cyclist

Rune Monstad (born April 14, 1973), also known as The Viking Biker, is a Norwegian cyclist who cycled around the world on a 27-speed Gekko mountain bike from 2005 to 2010. Born in Tønsberg, Norway, Rune went to Bolivia in 2004 to work with homeless children for a year. After returning to Norway, he decided he wanted to cycle all over the world, so he started in South America in December 2005, then cycled through Central America, Mexico and then across the United States. In November 2006, Rune started his trip to Canada and cycled across Canada (from west to east) in the winter, the first known person to do so. He was fully equipped with winter camping gear for sub-freezing temperatures.

In May 2007, he left for Africa, cycling through Senegal, Nigeria, Cameroon, Gabon, Congo, South Africa, Indonesia, Australia. He completed his trip in 2010, returning to live in Norway. In Africa, Rune was called "Paco", as it was too difficult for the locals to pronounce his name.

Rune never paid for accommodation, and lived off $5–$10 per day USD. He carried a tent with him, but hardly had to use it, as many people offered him a place to stay in their homes. A few motels, lodges and hostels also offered him free accommodations as well as meals. Rune operated mostly on donations as cycling every day did not allow for time to work a regular job. He occasionally takes a few days off to see the local sights, attend special events and to meet with people in bicycle shops and cafes.

== Personal life ==
Rune is now married to Amelia Monstad with three children, and lives in the Yukon, Canada.

== Canada Trip ==
On February 3, 2007, while he was in Regina, Saskatchewan, he was invited to give a talk about winter cycling to a group of about 60 people with Regina EcoLiving Inc., a non-profit organization located in Regina. In areas where there is snow and/or ice in the winter, this is also called Icebiking.

On February 15, 2007, Rune arrived just west of Winnipeg, Manitoba, battling 50 kilometer per hour side winds with near whiteout conditions. He was featured in the Winnipeg Sun and Winnipeg Free Press over the weekend. While in Winnipeg, he was also invited to several events including a local Icebike event on February 18, which was sponsored by Woodcock Cycle Works. On March 3, he was invited to the Winnipeg Symphony Orchestra's Northern Landscape concert and was introduced on stage by the conductor of the symphony, Alexander Mickelthwate. The Norwegian Canadian Club of Winnipeg hosted a display in the lobby of the Centennial Concert Hall. The Norwegian Club promotes arts, crafts, foods and language of Norway as well as encouraging community among Norwegians. Rune's bicycle was placed on the Norwegian display that evening, and during the intermission and after the concert, he met many symphony patrons.

Rune met several cyclists during his stay in Winnipeg and gave a brief talk about his trip. The Norwegian and Scandinavian Clubs held a luncheon for him, and he gave a talk to those groups as well. He also met the Ambassador of Norway to Canada, His Excellency Mr. Tor. B. Naess.

On March 4, Rune left Winnipeg to continue his trip east. He arrived in Thunder Bay on March 13 and in Sault Ste. Marie on March 23. He arrived in Sudbury on March 27. CTV Northern Ontario and News 10 Persona in Sudbury filmed a story about him. On Thursday, March 29, he left Sudbury, arriving in North Bay on Friday, March 30. To view the photos from his Thunder Bay trip, visit the Thunder Bay cycling club web site at http://www.tbaycc.ca, then click on "The Viking Biker Visits Thunder Bay" on the left under "News at a Glance".

On April 8, Rune arrived in Montreal and was featured on CBC TV. On May 5, he arrived in Halifax, Nova Scotia and on May 24, 2007, he arrived in Corner Brook, Newfoundland and Labrador. Rune's plan is to cycle to L'Anse aux Meadows, where the Vikings first settled in North America. Rune's twin brother will be picking him up in a sailboat, and they will then sail to Africa, where Rune will continue his cycling adventure.

Rune has been interviewed on Conrad Schmidt's Pedal Revolutionary radio show in Vancouver, BC, KOMO-TV in Seattle, CBC Calgary and Global Winnipeg. Two television stations in Sudbury, Ontario also interviewed him. You can view these film clips on his web site. Several newspapers in the US, Canada and Norway have published stories about him.

Rune kept a daily diary with photos, thank-you credits, videos and stories about his adventure, which he updated weekly.
