= Niki Gudex =

Australian mountain biker

Personal information
- Full name: Niki Gudex

Cycling career
- Sport: Cycling
- Disciplines: MTB XC & DH
- Role: Rider

Professional team
- 2004: Intense

Niki Gudex is an Australian professional mountain biker from Sydney. She competes in both downhill and cross country disciplines.

In addition to being a professional mountainbiker, Gudex is also a model and a graphic designer. In the Australian edition of FHM magazine she has been listed in the 100 Sexiest Women in the World in 2002, 2003, 2004, 2005 and 2006.
