= Woody Headspeth =

American bicycle racer (1881–1941)

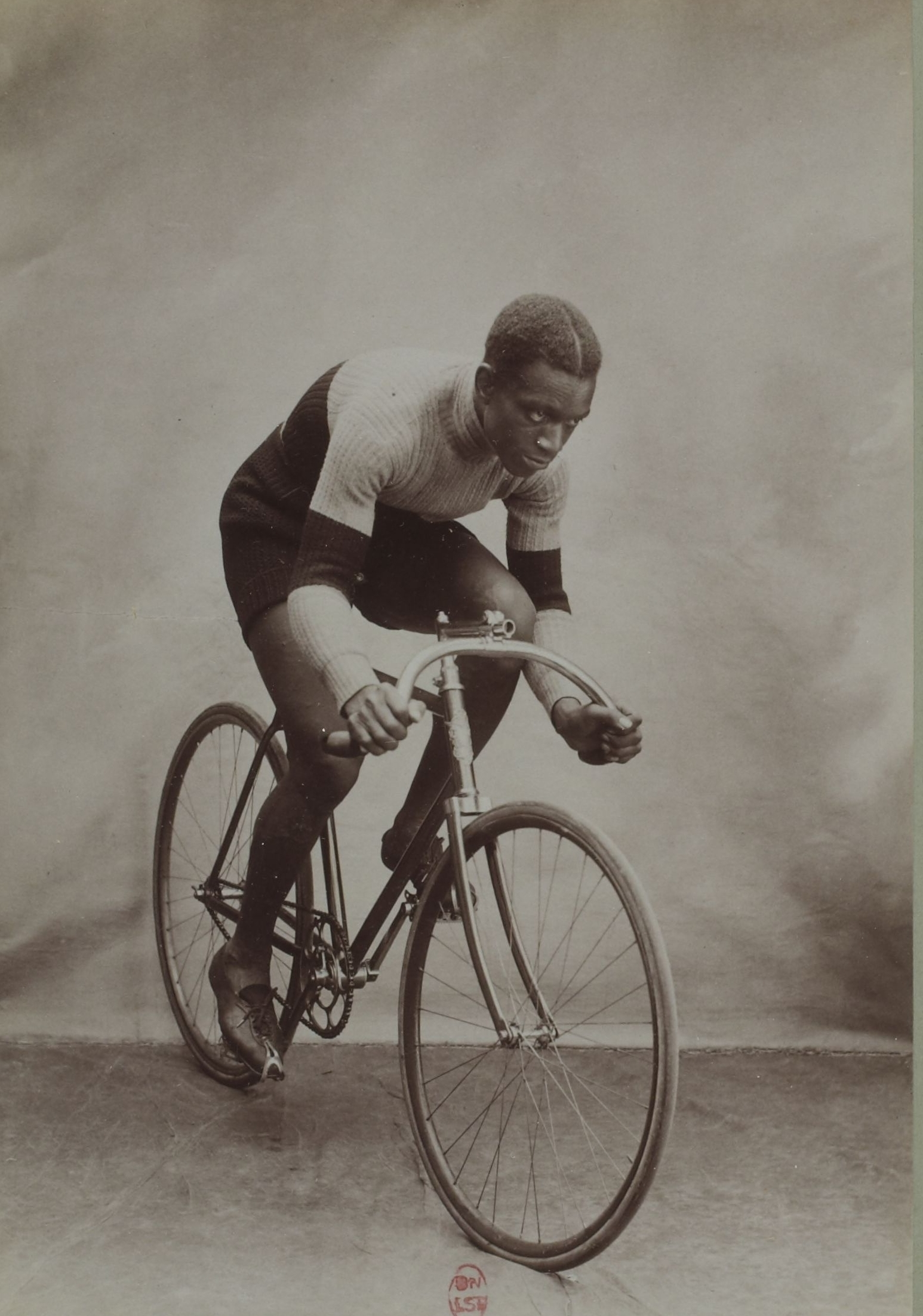
Woody Headspeth (1904)

Woody Headspeth (June 14, 1881 – April 16, 1941) was an American professional cyclist.

Woody Headspeth, also known as Hedspeth or Hedspath, was an early African American cyclist, first in the United States (U.S.), and later in Europe, where he was often listed as Hedspath. He was not as successful as Major Taylor who was the 1899 ICA Track Cycling World Champion. Major Taylor and Woody Headspeth were friends.

Woody Headspeth was said to have been born in Indianapolis, IN. His biggest success in the U.S. was his victory at the Six Day Race in Dayton (Ohio) that was disputed by single cyclists around the clock. He also competed at the Six Day Race in New York City. The race took place in 1903. Headspeth and his fellow cyclist named Dove placed 11th and last. Headspeth also worked as a bicycle mechanic.

Headspeth left the U.S. and went to Europe. In the U.S., he regularly had problems trying to get a racing license because he was a black man. In Europe, he competed in the lucrative motor-paced races, most noted in Germany, France, the Netherlands and Belgium. In 1903, he competed in the 24-hour-race Bol d’Or in Paris, France, but was not able to finish the race. In 1904, he returned to the United States and competed in a race in Dayton, OH, where he established a new hour record. Headspeth would return to Europe, and together with the Bohemian Emanuel Kudela, he placed second in a 24-hour race at the Velodrome in Steglitz near Berlin, Germany.

In Europe, racism and prejudices were less strong than in the States, but still there were some problems. When Headspeth competed in Amsterdam in 1905, all of the cyclists’ countries were mentioned in the program brochure, except for Headspeth; behind his name was written the word “negro“. Headspeth continued as a bicycle racer in Europe until he was 50 years old. He also worked as an assistant and mechanic on the cycling tracks, amongst others for stayer world champion Victor Linart.

In his private life, Headspeth had been married in the U.S. in 1899. In France, he was in a relationship or was married to a ballet dancer, and the couple had a daughter. When the German Wehrmacht occupied Paris in June 1940, Headspeth was sick. He fled from France to Portugal, where he was cared for by the Red Cross as a member of the Repatriation Group 14 from Paris. Woody Headspeth died of typhus and tuberculosis in the Curry Cabral Hospital in Lisbon. He is buried is Lisbon. Headspeth's belongings were described as poor and they were burned for health safety reasons.
