= Manfred Nepp =

German cyclist

Personal information
- Full name: Manfred Nepp

Cycling career
- Sport: Cycling
- Discipline: Track
- Role: Rider

Major wins
- Multiple World Masters Champion (Europe) Multiple European Masters Champion

Manfred Nepp was a German track cyclist. He has won the World and European Master Championship several times.
