= List of teams and cyclists in the 1919 Giro d'Italia =

The 1919 Giro d'Italia was the seventh edition of the Giro d'Italia, one of cycling's Grand Tours. The field consisted of 63 riders, and 15 riders finished the race.

Legend
No.	Starting number worn by the rider during the Giro
Pos.	Position in the general classification
DNF	Denotes a rider who did not finish

No.	Name	Nationality	Team
1	Costante Girardengo	Italy	
2	Angelo Gremo	Italy	
3	Clemente Canepari	Italy	
4	Alfonso Calzolari	Italy	
5	Giuseppe Oliveri	Italy	
6	Gaetano Belloni	Italy	
7	Luigi Lucotti	Italy	
8	Lauro Bordin	Italy	
9	Ugo Agostoni	Italy	
10	Oscar Egg	Switzerland	
11	Marcel Buysse	Belgium	
12	Giuseppe Azzini	Italy	
13	Lucien Buysse	Belgium	
14	Paride Ferrari	Italy	
15	Henri Van Lerberghe	Belgium	
16	Alfredo Sivocci	Italy	
17	Carlo Galetti	Italy	
19	Romeo Poid	Italy	
20	Arturo Ferrario	Italy	
21	Marcel Godivier	France	
22	Alois Verstraeten	Belgium	
23	Carlo Durando	Italy	
24	Giuseppe Santhià	Italy	
25	Lepoldo Toricelli	Italy	
26	Pietro Aymo	Italy	
27	Ezio Corlaita	Italy	
28	Camillo Bertarelli	Italy	Lone rider
30	Gino Brizzi	Italy	Lone rider
31	Giosue Lombardi	Italy	Lone rider
32	Luigi Cattaneo	Italy	Lone rider
33	Mario Bonfanti	Italy	Lone rider
37	Teodoro Spada	Italy	Lone rider
38	Ettore Mangano	Italy	Lone rider
39	Domenico Pirazzini	Italy	Lone rider
40	Francesco Pasini	Italy	Lone rider
41	Giuseppe Sioli	Italy	Lone rider
42	Edoardo Faverzani	Italy	Lone rider
47	Ottavio Pratesi	Italy	Lone rider
51	Dario Lagomarsino	Italy	Lone rider
52	Mario Santagostino	Italy	Lone rider
53	Angelo Erba	Italy	Lone rider
54	Ugo Ruggeri	Italy	Lone rider
55	Francesco Ceruti	Italy	Lone rider
56	Giovanni Marchese	Italy	Lone rider
57	Francesco Marchese	Italy	Lone rider
58	Domenico Schierano	Italy	Lone rider
59	Giovanni Roncon	Italy	Lone rider
60	Giuseppe Conti	Italy	Lone rider
61	Augusto Rho	Italy	Lone rider
63	Bartolomeo Aimo	Italy	Lone rider
73	Costante Costa	Italy	Lone rider
74	Enrico Sala	Italy	Lone rider
75	Luigi Vertemati	Italy	Lone rider
76	Giuseppe Pifferi	Italy	Lone rider
77	D. Guindani	Italy	Lone rider
78	Guido Matteoni	Italy	Lone rider
79	Sebastiano Utelle	Italy	Lone rider
80	Battista Bertolino	Italy	Lone rider
89	Giuseppe Borghi	Italy	Lone rider
94	Umberto Ripamonti	Italy	Lone rider
95	Luigi Sinchetto	Italy	Lone rider
100	Eberardo Pavesi	Italy	Lone rider
