= Passo del Turchino =

Mountain pass in Italy

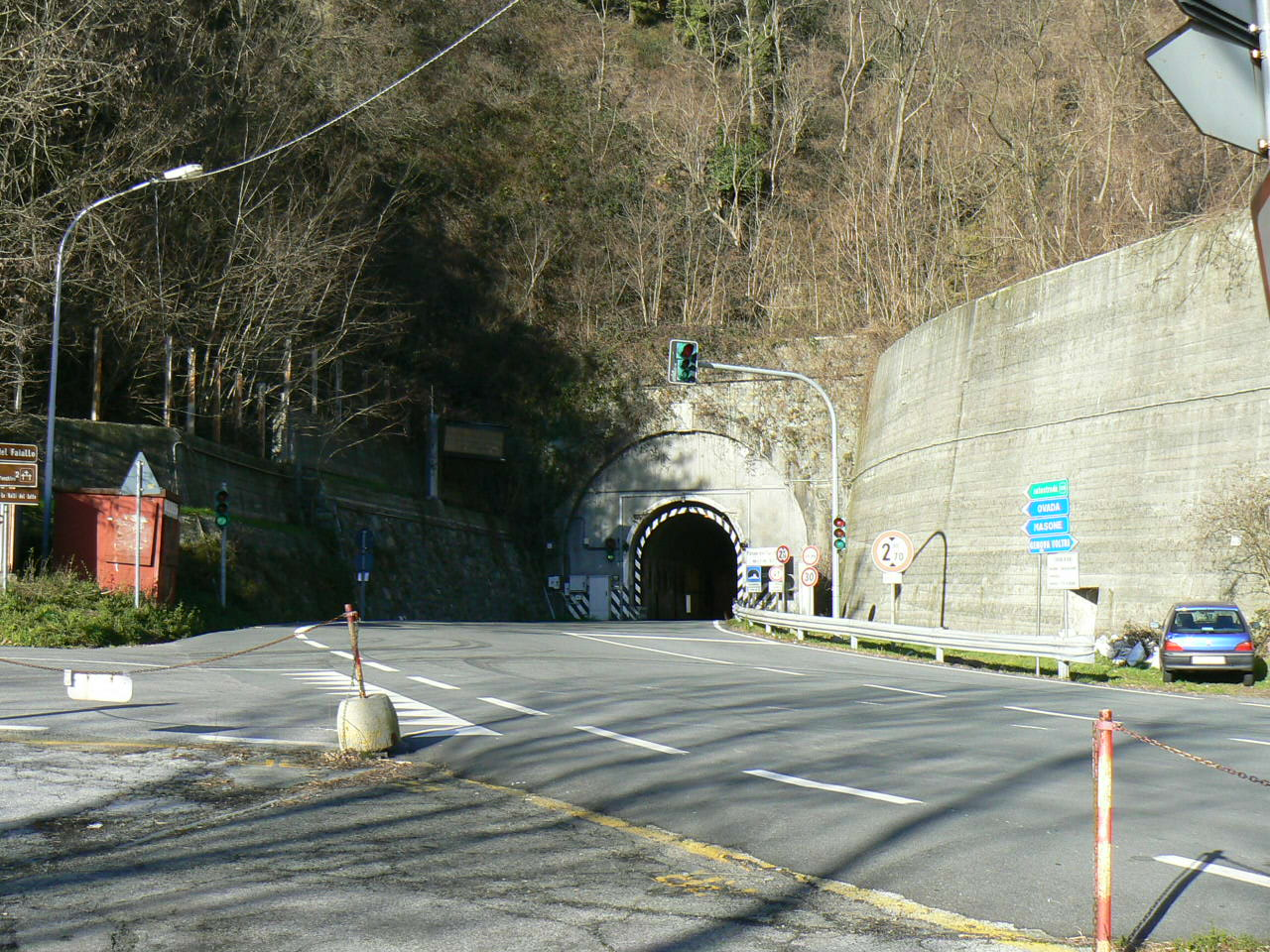
- Old road tunnel

- Location within Alps
- Elevation: 591 m (1,939 ft)

Location
- Location: Liguria, Italy
- Coordinates: 44°29′13″N 8°44′06″E

The Passo del Turchino is a mountain pass located between the cities of Masone and Mele in the Italian region Liguria. It is known for its annual appearance in the classic one-day cycling race Milan–San Remo, and occasionally in other races.

While in the early days of Milan–San Remo the Turchino contributed to deciding the winner of the race, it is now not considered selective enough to break up a racing peloton.

== History ==
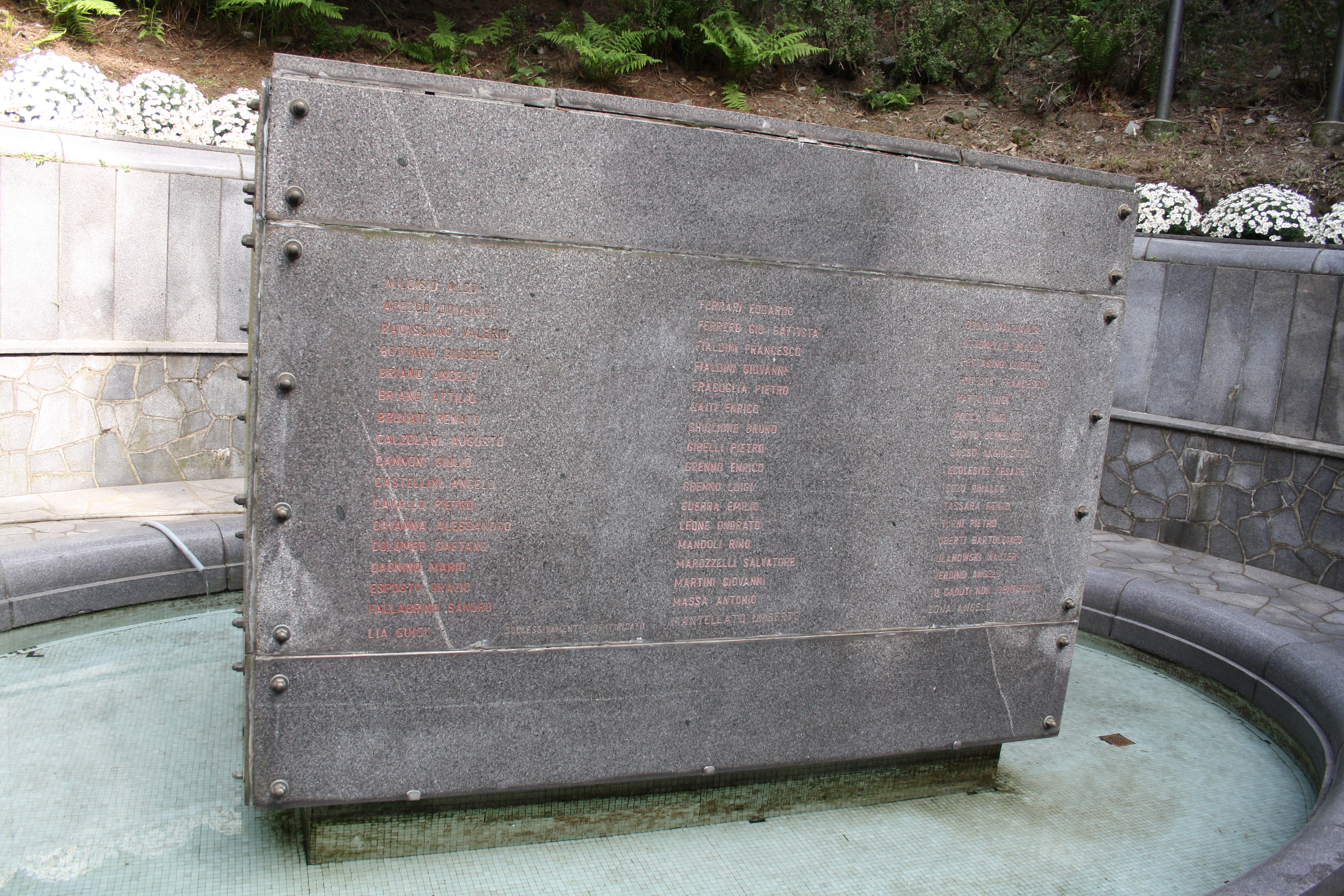
Memorial built on the site of the massacre

On 19 May 1944, fifty-nine civilians were murdered by Germans in a mass execution nearby. The episode is known as Strage del Turchino (Turchino massacre). This massacre was perpetrated as a retaliation following an attack from the Italian resistance when 5 German soldiers died.

== Details of the climb ==
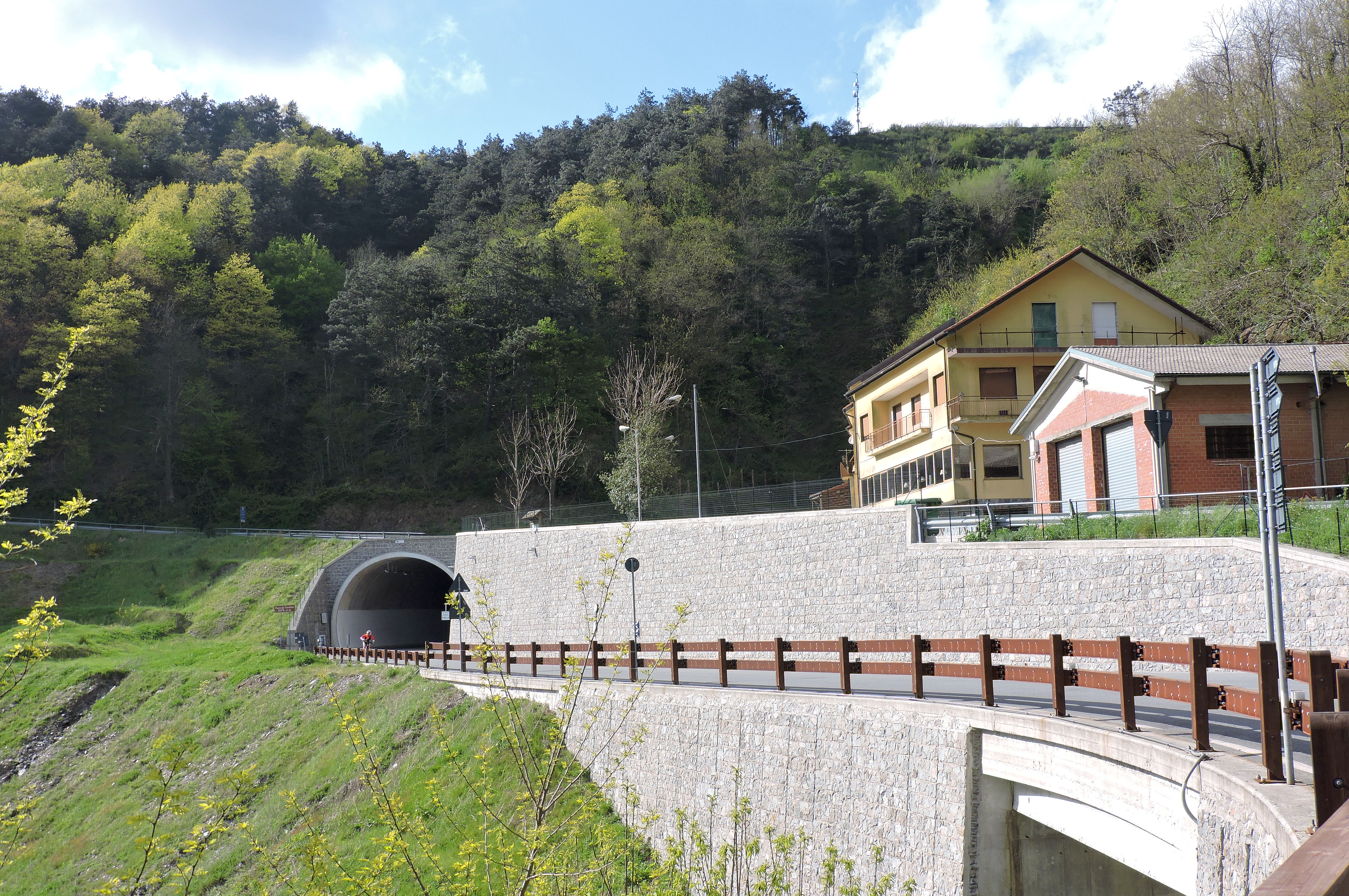
New road tunnel

The climb can be accessed by three roads, with the approach from Mele the most common. Though the climb from this road features some gradients topping 10%, these stretches are very brief and the average gradient is only 4%. The total distance of the climb from this road is 546 metres.

Starting from Voltri, the climb's average gradient is slightly higher at 4.5%, but there are no sections higher than 7%. The 526 metres in this climb are thus realized with a more steady gradient.

The easiest road up the Turchino starts in Ovada, and only has sections of higher than 4% at the very end of the climb. The average gradient starting from Ovada is only 1.5%, and the climb takes just 373 metres.

== Usage in Milan–San Remo ==
The Passo del Turchino has been used in Milan–San Remo every year it has been held except 2001, 2002 and 2020. Originally, the climb was quite selective, as for 14 out of the first 39 editions of the race, the man to the top of the Turchino first was the winner of the race. In 1910, there was so much snow on the Turchino that only four of the 63 riders who began the race finished it, and those who finished had to dismount and push their bikes through heavy snowdrifts at the top of the pass in order to get beyond it.

In recent years, the climb has not proven selective. The race almost inevitably ends with a mass sprint or a breakaway, formed after crossing the Turchino, comprising riders that would have otherwise been in the sprint.

=== Milan–San Remo winners who also were the first over the Passo del Turchino ===
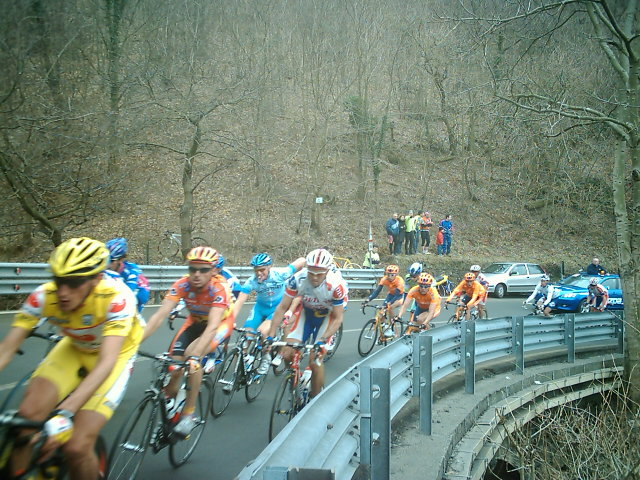
Ciclists climbing the pass during Milano-Sanremo 2005 edition

| Year | Rider | Won race by |
|---|---|---|
| 1908 | Cyrille van Hauwaert (BEL) | 3'30" |
| 1909 | Luigi Ganna (ITA) | 3'00" |
| 1912 | Henri Pelissier (FRA) | Won sprint |
| 1917 | Gaetano Belloni (ITA) | 11'48" |
| 1918 | Costante Girardengo (ITA) | 13'00" |
| 1919 | Angelo Gremo (ITA) | 2'15" |
| 1920 | Gaetano Belloni (ITA) | Won sprint |
| 1921 | Costante Girardengo (ITA) | Won sprint |
| 1925 | Costante Girardengo (ITA) | Won sprint |
| 1926 | Costante Girardengo (ITA) | 6'40" |
| 1927 | Pietro Chesi (ITA) | 9'00" |
| 1929 | Alfredo Binda (ITA) | 8'30" |
| 1931 | Alfredo Binda (ITA) | Won sprint |
| 1946 | Fausto Coppi (ITA) | 14'00" |

The Passo del Turchino has also been used in the Giro d'Italia, most recently in 2009, when Stefano Garzelli led the peloton over its summit.
