= Milano–Modena =

Race details
- Discipline: Road
- Type: One-day race

History
- First edition: 1906
- Editions: 41
- Final edition: 1955
- First winner: Anteo Carapezzi (ITA)
- Most wins: Costante Girardengo (ITA); Aldo Bini (ITA); (3 wins)
- Final winner: Fiorenzo Magni (ITA)

Milano–Modena was a single-day road bicycle race held annually in Umbria, Italy from 1906 to 1955. It was held as an individual time trial in 1928 and 1931.

== Winners ==
Year	Winner	Second	Third
1906	(Italy) Anteo Carapezzi	(Italy) Cesare Zanzotteria	(Italy) Giovanni Cunioli
1908	(Italy) Giovanni Cuniolo	(France) Omer Beaugendre	(Italy) Carlo Mairani
1909	(Italy) Cesare Zanzottera	(France) Georges Lorgeou	(Italy) Mario Bruschera
1910	(Italy) Luigi Ganna	(Italy) Giovanni Micheletto	(Italy) Emilio Petiva
1911	(Italy) Galeazzo Bolzoni	(Italy) Carlo Durando	(France) Eugène Dhers
1912	(Italy) Carlo Durando	(Italy) Angelo Gremo	(Belgium) Charles Deruyter
1913	(Italy) Ezio Corlaita	(Italy) Emilio Petiva	(Italy) Carlo Durando
1917	(Switzerland) Oscar Egg	(Italy) Costante Girardengo	(Italy) Alfredo Sivocci
1918	(Italy) Gaetano Belloni	(Italy) Lauro Bordin	(Belgium) Alexis Michiels
1919	(Italy) Costante Girardengo	(Italy) Ugo Agostoni	(Switzerland) Heiri Suter
1920	(Italy) Costante Girardengo	(Italy) Giuseppe Azzini	(Italy) Lauro Bordin
1921	(Italy) Gaetano Belloni	(Italy) Costante Girardengo	(Italy) Ugo Agostoni
1922	(Italy) Giovanni Bassi	(Italy) Ugo Agostoni	(Italy) Alessandro Tonani
1923	(Italy) Pietro Linari	(Italy) Pier Bestetti	(Italy) Federico Gay
1924	(Italy) Nello Ciaccheri	(Italy) Emilio Petiva	(Italy) Alfredo Dinale
1925	(Italy) Gaetano Belloni	(Italy) Alfredo Binda	(Italy) Giovanni Brunero
1926	(Italy) Alfredo Binda	(Italy) Giovanni Brunero	(Italy) Alfonso Piccin
1927	(Italy) Domenico Piemontesi	(Italy) Ermanno Vallazza	(Italy) Battista Giuntelli
1928	(Italy) Costante Girardengo	(Italy) Alfredo Binda	(Italy) Pietro Fossati
1929	(Italy) Felice Gremo	(Italy) Adriano Zanaga	(Italy) Allegro Grandi
1930	(Italy) Aimone Altissimo	(Italy) Aldo Canazza	(Italy) Armando Zucchini
1931	(Italy) Bruno Catellani	(Italy) Giuseppe Olmo	(Italy) Alfredo Bovet
1932	(Italy) Mario Cipriani	(Italy) Giovanni Firpo	(Italy) Vasco Bergamaschi
1933	(Italy) Bernardo Rogora	(Italy) Nino Sella	(Italy) Renato Scorticati
1934	(Italy) Learco Guerra	(Italy) Nino Borsari	(Italy) Bernardo Rogora
1935	(Italy) Learco Guerra	(Italy) Giuseppe Olmo	(Italy) Renato Scorticati
1936	(Italy) Aldo Bini	(Italy) Giuseppe Olmo	(Italy) Tolmino Gios
1937	(Italy) Aldo Bini	(Italy) Glauco Servadei	(Italy) Olimpio Bizzi
1938	(Italy) Aldo Bini	(Italy) Glauco Servadei	(Italy) Pietro Rimoldi
1939	(Italy) Marco Cimatti	(Italy) Gino Bisio	(Italy) Adolfo Leoni
1940	(Italy) Vasco Bergamaschi	(Italy) Piero Chiappini	(Switzerland) Hans Martin
1941	(Italy) Gino Bisio	(Italy) Primo Zuccotti	(Italy) Osvaldo Bailo
1942	(Italy) Diego Marabelli	(Italy) Mario De Benedetti	(Italy) Glauco Servadei
1947	(Italy) Oreste Conte	(Italy) Alfredo Martini	(Italy) Egidio Marangoni
1948	(Italy) Alberto Ghirardi	(Italy) Vito Ortelli	(Italy) Antonio Bevilacqua
1949	(Italy) Guido De Santi	(France) Daniel Orts	(Italy) Luciano Maggini
1950	(Italy) Pasquale Fornara	(Italy) Luciano Maggini	(Italy) Alfredo Martini
1951	(Italy) Giorgio Albani	(Italy) Giovanni Pinarello	(Italy) Giuseppe Doni
1953	(Italy) Andrea Barro	(Italy) Arnaldo Faccioli	(Italy) Tranquillo Scudellaro
1954	(Italy) Fiorenzo Magni	(Italy) Bruno Monti	(Italy) Giorgio Albani
1955	(Italy) Fiorenzo Magni	(Italy) Fausto Coppi	(Belgium) Germain Derijcke
