= 1924 Milan–San Remo =

Race details
- Dates: 16 March 1924
- Stages: 1
- Distance: 286.5 km (178.0 mi)
- Winning time: 10h 50' 00"

Results
| | Winner | Pietro Linari (ITA) | (Legnano–Pirelli) |
| | Second | Gaetano Belloni (ITA) | (Legnano–Pirelli) |
| | Third | Costante Girardengo (ITA) | (Maino) |

The 1924 Milan–San Remo was the 17th edition of the Milan–San Remo cycle race and was held on 16 March 1924. The race started in Milan and finished in San Remo. The race was won by Pietro Linari of the Legnano–Pirelli team.

== General classification ==
Final general classification

| Rank | Rider | Team | Time |
|---|---|---|---|
| 1 | Pietro Linari (ITA) | Legnano–Pirelli | 10h 50' 00" |
| 2 | Gaetano Belloni (ITA) | Legnano–Pirelli | + 0" |
| 3 | Costante Girardengo (ITA) | Maino | + 0" |
| 4 | Pietro Bestetti (ITA) | Maino | + 0" |
| 5 | Ottavio Bottecchia (ITA) | Automoto | + 0" |
| 5 | Nello Ciaccheri (ITA) | | + 0" |
| 5 | Nicolas Frantz (LUX) | | + 0" |
| 5 | Federico Gay (ITA) | | + 0" |
| 5 | Félix Sellier (BEL) | Alcyon–Dunlop | + 0" |
| 10 | Bartolomeo Aimo (ITA) | Legnano–Pirelli | + 0" |
