= 1918 Giro di Lombardia =

Race details
- Dates: 10 November 1918
- Stages: 1
- Distance: 256 km (159.1 mi)
- Winning time: 7h 08' 00"

Results
	Winner	Gaetano Belloni (ITA)
	Second	Alfredo Sivocci (ITA)
	Third	Carlo Galetti (ITA)

The 1918 Giro di Lombardia was the 14th edition of the Giro di Lombardia cycle race and was held on 10 November 1918. The race started in Milan and finished in Sesto San Giovanni. The race was won by Gaetano Belloni of the Bianchi team.

== General classification ==
Final general classification

Rank	Rider	Team	Time
1	Gaetano Belloni (ITA)	Bianchi	7h 08' 00"
2	Alfredo Sivocci (ITA)		+ 0"
3	Carlo Galetti (ITA)		+ 0"
4	Alexis Michiels (BEL)		+ 0"
5	Leopoldo Torricelli (ITA)		+ 0"
6	Giuseppe Azzini (ITA)		+ 0"
7	Clemente Canepari (ITA)	Stucchi	+ 0"
8	Lauro Bordin (ITA)	Bianchi	+ 0"
9	Romeo Poid (ITA)		+ 0"
10	Arturo Ferrario (ITA)		+ 0"
