= 1915 Giro di Lombardia =

Race details
- Dates: 7 November 1915
- Stages: 1
- Distance: 232 km (144.2 mi)

Results
	Winner	Gaetano Belloni (ITA)
	Second	Paride Ferrari (ITA)
	Third	Gaetano Caravaglia (ITA)

The 1915 Giro di Lombardia was the eleventh edition of the Giro di Lombardia cycle race and was held on 7 November 1915, over a course of 232 km (144 mi). The race was won by Italian Gaetano Belloni, who reached the finish line at an average speed of 28.330 km/h (17.603 mph), preceding his compatriots, Paride Ferrari and Gaetano Caravaglia.

117 cyclists (of 164 signed up) departed from Milan and 55 completed the race.

== General classification ==
Final general classification

Rank	Rider	Team	Time
1	Gaetano Belloni (ITA)		6h 42' 24"
2	Paride Ferrari (ITA)		+ 0"
3	Gaetano Caravaglia (ITA)		+ 2' 56"
4	Romeo Poid (ITA)		+ 2' 56"
5	Camillo Bertarelli (ITA)	Ganna	+ 2' 56"
6	Lauro Bordin (ITA)	Bianchi	+ 7' 58"
7	Umberto Ripamonti (ITA)		+ 7' 58"
8	Rinaldo Spinelli (ITA)		+ 7' 58"
9	Alfredo Sivocci (ITA)	Dei	+ 12' 26"
10	Giuseppe Contesini (ITA)	Dei	+ 12' 26"
