= 1921 Giro di Lombardia =

Race details
- Dates: 10 November 1921
- Stages: 1
- Distance: 261 km (162.2 mi)
- Winning time: 9h 30' 30"

Results
	Winner	Costante Girardengo (ITA)
	Second	Gaetano Belloni (ITA)
	Third	Federico Gay (ITA)

The 1921 Giro di Lombardia was the 17th edition of the Giro di Lombardia cycle race and was held on 10 November 1921, on a course of 261 km (162 mi). The race started and finished in Milan. The race was won by the Italian Costante Girardengo, who reached the finish line at an average speed of 27.450 km/h (17.057 mph), preceding his compatriots Gaetano Belloni and Federico Gay.

67 cyclists departed from Milan and 32 completed the race.

== General classification ==
Final general classification

Rank	Rider	Team	Time
1	Costante Girardengo (ITA)	Stucchi-Pirelli	9h 30' 30"
2	Gaetano Belloni (ITA)	Bianchi-Dunlop	+ 0"
3	Federico Gay (ITA)	Bianchi-Dunlop	+ 0"
4	Giovanni Brunero (ITA)	Legnano-Pirelli	+ 0"
5	Henri Pélissier (FRA)	Bianchi-Dunlop	+ 0"
6	Giovanni Bassi (ITA)	Individual	+ 0"
7	Heiri Suter (SUI)	Individual	+ 0"
8	Emilio Petiva (ITA)	Individual	+ 0"
9	Leopoldo Torricelli (ITA)	Legnano-Pirelli	+ 0"
10	Bartolomeo Aimo (ITA)	Legnano-Pirelli	+ 0"
