= 1928 Giro di Lombardia =

Race details
- Dates: 3 November 1928
- Stages: 1
- Distance: 248 km (154.1 mi)
- Winning time: 8h 59' 00"

Results
	Winner	Gaetano Belloni (ITA)
	Second	Allegro Grandi (ITA)
	Third	Pietro Fossati (ITA)

The 1928 Giro di Lombardia was the 24th edition of the Giro di Lombardia cycle race and was held on 3 November 1928. The race started and finished in Milan. The race was won by Gaetano Belloni.

== General classification ==
Final general classification

Rank	Rider	Team	Time
1	Gaetano Belloni (ITA)	Wolsit-Pirelli	8h 59' 00"
2	Allegro Grandi (ITA)	Bianchi-Pirelli	+ 0"
3	Pietro Fossati (ITA)	Maino-Dunlop	+ 0"
4	Ambrogio Beretta (ITA)	Legnano-Torpedo	+ 0"
5	Alessandro Catalani (ITA)	Wolsit-Pirelli	+ 1' 10"
6	Leonida Frascarelli (ITA)		+ 2' 05"
7	Mario Bianchi (ITA)		+ 6' 00"
8	Alfonso Piccin (ITA)	Bianchi-Pirelli	+ 6' 00"
=9	Angelo Rinaldi (ITA)		+ 11' 00"
=9	Francesco Oliveri (ITA)		+ 11' 00"
