= 1920 Milan–San Remo =

Race details
- Dates: 25 March 1920
- Stages: 1
- Distance: 286.5 km (178.0 mi)
- Winning time: 9h 27' 00"

Results
	Winner	Gaetano Belloni (ITA)
	Second	Henri Pélissier (FRA)
	Third	Costante Girardengo (ITA)

The 1920 Milan–San Remo was the 13th edition of the Milan–San Remo cycle race and was held on 25 March 1920. The race started in Milan and finished in San Remo. The race was won by Gaetano Belloni.

== General classification ==
Final general classification

Rank	Rider	Time
1	Gaetano Belloni (ITA)	9h 27' 00"
2	Henri Pélissier (FRA)	+ 0"
3	Costante Girardengo (ITA)	+ 0"
4	Giuseppe Azzini (ITA)	+ 0"
5	Giovanni Brunero (ITA)	+ 0"
6	Louis Luguet (FRA)	+ 15' 00"
7	Francis Pélissier (FRA)	+ 15' 00"
8	Ugo Agostoni (ITA)	+ 26' 30"
9	Alfredo Sivocci (ITA)	+ 34' 00"
10	Jean Alavoine (FRA)	+ 41' 00"
