= 1926 Milan–San Remo =

Race details
- Dates: 21 March 1926
- Stages: 1
- Distance: 285.5 km (177.4 mi)
- Winning time: 9h 48' 00"

Results
	Winner	Costante Girardengo (ITA)
	Second	Nello Ciaccheri (ITA)
	Third	Egidio Picchiottino (ITA)

The 1926 Milan–San Remo was the 19th edition of the Milan–San Remo cycle race and was held on 21 March 1926. The race started in Milan and finished in San Remo. The race was won by Costante Girardengo.

== General classification ==
Final general classification

Rank	Rider	Time
1	Costante Girardengo (ITA)	9h 48' 00"
2	Nello Ciaccheri (ITA)	+ 6' 40"
3	Egidio Picchiottino (ITA)	+ 11' 15"
4	Gaetano Belloni (ITA)	+ 12' 45"
5	Ardito Bresciani (ITA)	+ 17' 30"
6	Ermanno Vallazza (ITA)	+ 18' 30"
7	Giuseppe Pancera (ITA)	+ 18' 35"
8	Marcel Huot (FRA)	+ 21' 00"
9	Romain Bellenger (FRA)	+ 22' 30"
10	Secondo Martinetto (ITA)	+ 30' 00"
