= 1918 Milan–San Remo =

Race details
- Dates: 14 April 1918
- Stages: 1
- Distance: 286.5 km (178.0 mi)
- Winning time: 11h 48' 00"

Results
| | Winner | Costante Girardengo (ITA) |
| | Second | Gaetano Belloni (ITA) |
| | Third | Ugo Agostoni (ITA) |

The 1918 Milan–San Remo was the 11th edition of the Milan–San Remo cycle race and was held on 14 April 1918. The race started in Milan and finished in San Remo. The race was won by Costante Girardengo.

== General classification ==
Final general classification

| Rank | Rider | Time |
|---|---|---|
| 1 | Costante Girardengo (ITA) | 11h 48' 00" |
| 2 | Gaetano Belloni (ITA) | + 13' 00" |
| 3 | Ugo Agostoni (ITA) | + 59' 00" |
| 4 | Ezio Corlaita (ITA) | + 1h 37' 00" |
| 5 | Costante Costa (ITA) | + 1h 37' 00" |
| 6 | Carlo Giacchino (ITA) | + 2h 52' 00" |
| 7 | Luigi Vertemati (ITA) | + 4h 02' 00" |
