= 1919 Giro d'Italia =

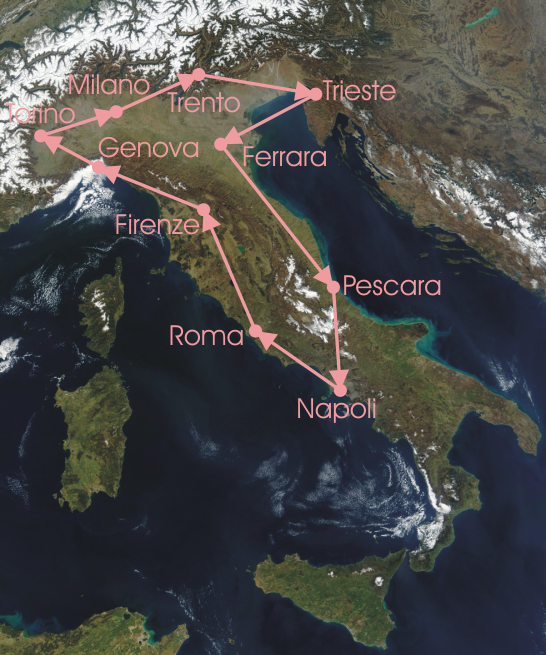
- Race Route

Race details
- Dates: 21 May – 8 June 1919
- Stages: 10
- Distance: 2,984 km (1,854 mi)
- Winning time: 112h 51' 29"

Results
	Winner	Costante Girardengo (ITA)	(Stucchi)
	Second	Gaetano Belloni (ITA)	(Bianchi)
	Third	Marcel Buysse (BEL)	(Bianchi)
	Team	Stucchi - Dunlop	

The 1919 Giro d'Italia was the seventh edition of the Giro d'Italia, a Grand Tour organized and sponsored by the newspaper La Gazzetta dello Sport. The race began on 21 May in Milan with a stage that stretched 302.8 km (188 mi) to Trento, finishing back in Milan on 8 June after a 277 km (172 mi) stage and a total distance covered of 2,984 km (1,854 mi). The race was won by the Italian rider Costante Girardengo of the Stucchi team. Second and third respectively were Italian Gaetano Belloni and Belgian Marcel Buysse.

Of 66 riders starting the race, only 15 completed it. The Giro (the first one after the Great War) had the first two stages arriving in the "unredeemed" cities of Trento and Trieste, and was dominated by Girardengo, who won seven stages. The '"eternal second" Gaetano Belloni won his first stage in the Giro.

This edition of the race was also characterised by the first stage victory by a Swiss rider and by the first non-Italian cyclist on the final podium: the Belgian Marcel Buysse.

== Participants ==
Of the 63 riders that began the Giro d'Italia on 21 May, fifteen of them made it to the finish in Milan on 8 June. Riders were allowed to ride on their own or as a member of a team. There were four teams that competed in the race: Bianchi Pirelli, Legnano-Pirelli, Peugeot-Tedeschi, and Stucchi-Dunlop. The isolati riders that participated in the race were primarily war veterans. Organizers promised all isolati riders at least 180 lire if they reached Milan. The Milan Army Corps carried participants luggage for the race with a Fiat 18 BL lorry that remained after the war.

The peloton was almost completely composed of Italians. The field featured two former Giro d'Italia champions in the three-time winner Carlo Galetti and Eberardo Pavesi who was a member of the 1912 Atala winning team. Other notable Italian riders that started the race included Costante Girardengo, Angelo Gremo, Ezio Corlaita, and Giuseppe Santhià. Girardengo was current Italian men's road race champion and was recovering from the Spanish flu.

== Race summary ==
The first stage ended in Trento, which was at that time part of Austria-Hungary, although it had been occupied by Italian soldiers following World War I, and would annexed by Italy later that year. This was the first time that an international border was crossed during the Giro d'Italia. This first stage ended in a small group sprint, won by Costante Girardengo, who thereby became leader.

The second stage went to Trieste, also not yet annexed by Italy. This region had been heavily damaged in the war, and roads were in bad condition. At one point, the Tagliamento needed to be crossed, but the bridge had collapsed. Riders had to cross the water by foot, carrying their bikes. Girardengo won that stage after a solo escape, and remained leader.

The third stage ended in a bunch sprint, but now Girardengo was beaten to second place by Oscar Egg. Girardengo remained firmly in the lead.

The fourth stage was 411 km, only seven stages have been longer in the Giro. In that stage, Corlaita and Lucotti escaped and stayed away until the finish, taking more than eight minutes on all the other riders. Girardengo stayed on top of the general classification. He was the favourite to win, but the race was not yet seen as decided.

In the fifth stage, Girardengo did better. He was part of the first group of four riders that finished more than 17 minutes ahead of the rest. In the sprint he lost against Belloni, but in the general classification he increased his leading margin to 23 minutes.

From then on, there were five more stages. They were all won by Girardengo. This also included the eighth stage. While waiting for the second rider to arrive, he was interviewed by Emilio Colombo, who asked Girardengo how he would like to be called. Girardengo told Colombo to do what he thought best, and Colombo decided to call him the Champion of Champions (ti chiamerò campionissimo). This name would be used for Girardengo for the rest of his career.

== Final standings ==
=== Stage results ===
Stage results
Stage	Date	Course	Distance	Type (Note: In 1919, there was no distinction in the rules between plain stages and mountain stages; the icons shown here indicate that the first, second, fifth, seventh, eighth, and ninth stages included major mountains.)	Winner	Race Leader
1	21 May	Milan to Trento	302.8 km (188 mi)	Stage with mountain(s)	Costante Girardengo (ITA)	Costante Girardengo (ITA)
2	23 May	Trento to Trieste	334.3 km (208 mi)	Stage with mountain(s)	Costante Girardengo (ITA)	Costante Girardengo (ITA)
3	25 May	Trieste to Ferrara	282 km (175 mi)	Plain stage	Oscar Egg (SUI)	Costante Girardengo (ITA)
4	27 May	Ferrara to Pescara	411.2 km (256 mi)	Plain stage	Ezio Corlaita (ITA)	Costante Girardengo (ITA)
5	29 May	Pescara to Naples	312.5 km (194 mi)	Stage with mountain(s)	Gaetano Belloni (ITA)	Costante Girardengo (ITA)
6	31 May	Naples to Rome	203.8 km (127 mi)	Plain stage	Costante Girardengo (ITA)	Costante Girardengo (ITA)
7	2 June	Rome to Florence	350.8 km (218 mi)	Stage with mountain(s)	Costante Girardengo (ITA)	Costante Girardengo (ITA)
8	4 June	Florence to Genoa	261.8 km (163 mi)	Stage with mountain(s)	Costante Girardengo (ITA)	Costante Girardengo (ITA)
9	6 June	Genoa to Turin	248 km (154 mi)	Stage with mountain(s)	Costante Girardengo (ITA)	Costante Girardengo (ITA)
10	8 June	Turin to Milan	277 km (172 mi)	Plain stage	Costante Girardengo (ITA)	Costante Girardengo (ITA)
	Total		2,984 km (1,854 mi)			

=== General classification ===
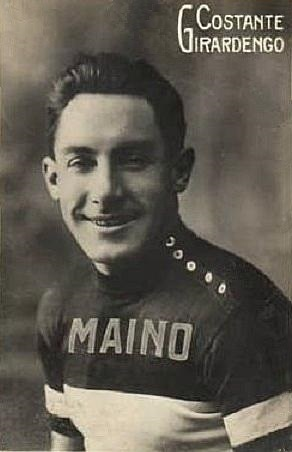
Costante Girardengo won the race after leading it from start to finish.

There were fifteen cyclists who had completed all ten stages. For these cyclists, the times they had needed in each stage was added up for the general classification. The cyclist with the least accumulated time was the winner. Giosuè Lombardi won the prize for best ranked independent rider in the general classification.

Final general classification (1–10)
Rank	Name	Team	Time
1	Costante Girardengo (ITA)	Stucchi-Dunlop	112h 51' 29"
2	Gaetano Belloni (ITA)	Bianchi	+ 51' 56"
3	Marcel Buysse (BEL)	Bianchi	+ 1h 05' 31"
4	Clemente Canepari (ITA)	Stucchi-Dunlop	+ 1h 34' 35"
5	Ugo Agostoni (ITA)	Bianchi	+ 1h 39' 39"
6	Angelo Gremo (ITA)	Stucchi-Dunlop	+ 2h 20' 01"
7	Ezio Corlaita (ITA)	Stucchi-Dunlop	+ 4h 12' 07"
8	Lauro Bordin (ITA)	Maino	+ 4h 16' 32"
9	Giosuè Lombardi (ITA)	—	+ 4h 28' 33"
10	Ugo Ruggeri (ITA)	—	+ 6h 03' 51"

Final general classification (11–15)
Rank	Name	Team	Time
11	Marcel Godivier (FRA)	Bianchi	+ 6h 52' 54"
12	Costante Costa (ITA)	Verdi	+ 6h 53' 31"
13	Enrico Sala (ITA)	—	+ 7h 15' 17"
14	Ottavio Pratesi (ITA)	—	+ 7h 57' 40"
15	Francesco Marchese (ITA)	Verdi	+ 9h 20' 59"

=== Points classification ===
There was a points based classification for the race.

Final points classification (1–10)
Rank	Name	Team	Points
1	Costante Girardengo (ITA)	Stucchi-Dunlop	21
2	Gaetano Belloni (ITA)	Bianchi	46
3	Marcel Buysse (BEL)	Bianchi	62
4	Clemente Canepari (ITA)	Stucchi-Dunlop	73
5	Angelo Gremo (ITA)	Stucchi-Dunlop	78
6	Ugo Agostoni (ITA)	Bianchi	88
7	Ezio Corlaita (ITA)	Stucchi-Dunlop	9?
8	Marcel Godivier (ITA)	Bianchi	99
9	Giosuè Lombardi (ITA)	—	119
9	Lauro Bordin (ITA)	Maino	119
