= Gaetano Belloni =

Italian cyclist (1892–1980)

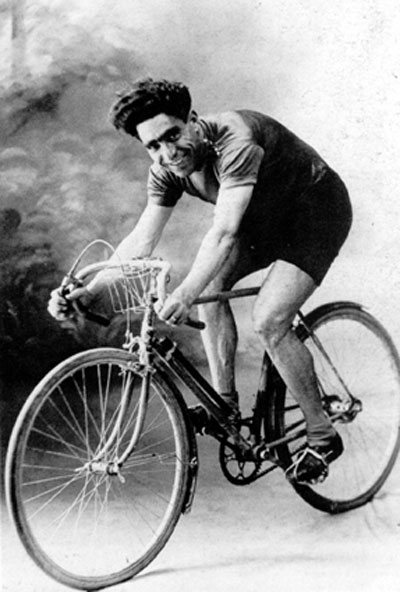

Personal information
- Full name: Gaetano Belloni
- Born: 26 August 1892 Pizzighettone, Italy
- Died: 9 January 1980

Cycling career
- Sport: Cycling
- Discipline: Road
- Role: Rider

Professional teams
- 1916–1922: Bianchi
- 1923–1924: Legnano
- 1925: Wolsit
- 1926–1927: Opel
- 1928: Wolsit
- 1929–1931: Bianchi
- 1932: Olympia

Major wins
- Grand Tours Giro d'Italia General classification (1920) One-day races and Classics Milan–San Remo (1917, 1920) Giro di Lombardia (1915, 1918, 1928)

Gaetano Belloni (26 August 1892 – 9 January 1980) was an Italian professional road racing cyclist. The highlights of his career were his overall win in the 1920 Giro d'Italia, the two victories in Milan–San Remo (1917 and 1920), and the three victories in the Giro di Lombardia (1915, 1918 and 1928).

Belloni was born at Pizzighettone, near Cremona, and made his debut in the road cycling world in the wake of his elder brother Amleto. As an amateur, in 1914 he won the "Small" Giro di Lombardia and the Coppa del Re, as well as the Italian championship.

Having avoided to be called to the front, Belloni won surprisingly, the overall Giro di Lombardia in 1915 (a feat he repeated in 1918 and 1928) and the Milan–San Remo of 1917.

In 1920 he obtained his greatest victory, the Giro d'Italia. In the 1920s Belloni constantly rivalled with his friend Costante Girardengo, being almost always defeated and gaining for this reason the nickname of "Eterno secondo" ("Eternal second"). In 1921 he finished second in the Giro, only 41 seconds behind, and he had to retire in 1922 while he was leading the race.

The latest Giro where he played a big role was the 1929 Giro d'Italia, where he won the first stage, and was leader of the general classification for the first three stages. In that Giro, Belloni collided with a young boy, killing the boy, and Belloni left the race after this accident.

He won a total of 43 races as a professional, including 12 stages at the Giro d'Italia. Belloni retired when he was 40 years old, and went on to become director of the Velodromo Vigorelli.

== Major results ==
1914
1st National Road Championships, Road Race (Amateurs)
1st Piccolo Giro di Lombardia
1st Coppa del Re

1915
1st Giro di Lombardia

1916
1st Milano–Bellagio–Varese

1917
1st Overall Giro della Provincia Milano (with Alfredo Sivocci)

1st Stage 1

1st Milan–San Remo
1st Milano–Bellagio–Varese
2nd Milano–La Spezia

1918
1st Giro di Lombardia
1st Milano–Modena
1st Milano–Torino
1st Torino-Arquata (with Lauro Bordin, Costante Girardengo & Luigi-Natale Lucotti)
2nd Milan–San Remo
3rd Milano–Bellagio–Varese

1919
2nd Overall Giro d'Italia

1st Stage 5

2nd Overall Roma–Trento–Trieste
2nd Giro di Lombardia
2nd Giro del Piemonte
2nd Roma–Trente–Trieste
3rd Giro della Provincia Milano

1920
1st Overall Giro d'Italia

1st Stages 2, 3, 7 & 8

1st Overall Giro della Provincia Milano (with Giuseppe Azzini)

1st Stage 1

1st Milan–San Remo
2nd National Road Championships, Road Race
2nd Milano–Torino
3rd Giro di Lombardia
3rd Giro del Piemonte

1921
1st Overall Giro della Provincia Milano

1st Stage 1

2nd Overall Giro d'Italia

1st Stages 5, 9 & 10

1st Milano–Modena
2nd Giro di Lombardia
2nd Roma–Napoli–Roma
8th Milan–San Remo

1922
1st Overall Giro della Provincia Milano (with Giovanni Brunero)

1st Stage 1

1st Six Days of New York City
1st Stages 1 & 3 Giro d'Italia
2nd Giro della Romagna
2nd Tour du lac Léman

1923
2nd Milan–San Remo
2nd Milano–Torino

1924
2nd Milan–San Remo
2nd Giro del Veneto
2nd Giro dell'Emilia

1925
1st Giro del Piemonte
1st Milano–Modena
1st Stages 5 & 12 Giro d'Italia
2nd Roma–Napoli–Roma
3rd National Road Championships, Road Race

1926
1st Grosser Strassenpreis von Hannover
1st Rund um die Hainleite
1st Groβer Sachsenpreis
2nd Berlin–Cottbus–Berlin
2nd Rund um Frankfurt
2nd Six Days of New York City
3rd Rund um Köln
4th Milan–San Remo

1927
1st Rund um Köln
2nd Quer durch Thüringen
2nd Thüringen-Rundfahrt
2nd Berlin–Cottbus–Berlin
3rd Stuttgart Criterium

1928
1st Giro di Lombardia
2nd Six Days of New York City
3rd Groβer Sachsenpreis

1929
1st Roma–Napoli–Roma
1st Six Days of Chicago
1st Stage 1 Giro d'Italia
3rd Six Days of New York City

1930
1st Six Days of New York City

1935
3rd Six Days of New York City

=== Results timelines ===
Grand Tour	1915	1916	1917	1918	1919	1920	1921	1922	1923	1924	1925	1926	1927	1928	1929	1930	1931	1932
Giro d'Italia	—	—	—	—	2	1	2	DNF	—	DNF	4	—	—	—	DNF	—	—	DNF
Tour de France	—	—	—	—	—	DNF	—	—	—	—	—	—	—	—	—	DNF	—	—
Vuelta a España	—	—	—	—	—	—	—	—	—	—	—	—	—	—	—	—	—	—
Monument	1915	1916	1917	1918	1919	1920	1921	1922	1923	1924	1925	1926	1927	1928	1929	1930	1931	1932
Milan–San Remo	—	—	1	2	—	1	8	—	2	2	—	8	—	—	—	—	—	13
Tour of Flanders	—	—	—	—	—	—	—	—	—	—	—	—	—	—	—	—	—	—
Paris–Roubaix	—	—	—	—	—	—	37	6	—	—	—	—	—	—	—	—	—	—
Liège–Bastogne–Liège	—	—	—	—	—	—	—	—	—	—	—	—	—	—	—	—	—	—
Giro di Lombardia	1	—	6	1	2	3	2	—	—	6	—	—	—	1	—	—	—	—
