= 1921 Milan–San Remo =

Race details
- Dates: 3 April 1921
- Stages: 1
- Distance: 286.5 km (178.0 mi)
- Winning time: 9h 30' 00"

Results
	Winner	Costante Girardengo (ITA)
	Second	Giovanni Brunero (ITA)
	Third	Giuseppe Azzini (ITA)

The 1921 Milan–San Remo was the 14th edition of the Milan–San Remo cycle race and was held on 3 April 1921. The race started in Milan and finished in San Remo. The race was won by Costante Girardengo.

== General classification ==
Final general classification

Rank	Rider	Time
1	Costante Girardengo (ITA)	9h 30' 00"
2	Giovanni Brunero (ITA)	+ 0"
3	Giuseppe Azzini (ITA)	+ 3' 30"
4	Alfredo Sivocci (ITA)	+ 3' 30"
5	Ugo Agostoni (ITA)	+ 8' 00"
6	Henri Pélissier (FRA)	+ 8' 00"
7	Clemente Canepari (ITA)	+ 8' 00"
8	Gaetano Belloni (ITA)	+ 14' 00"
9	Carlo Galetti (ITA)	+ 16' 30"
10	Philippe Thys (BEL)	+ 17' 10"
