= Legnano (cycling team) =

Italian cycling team (1906–1966)

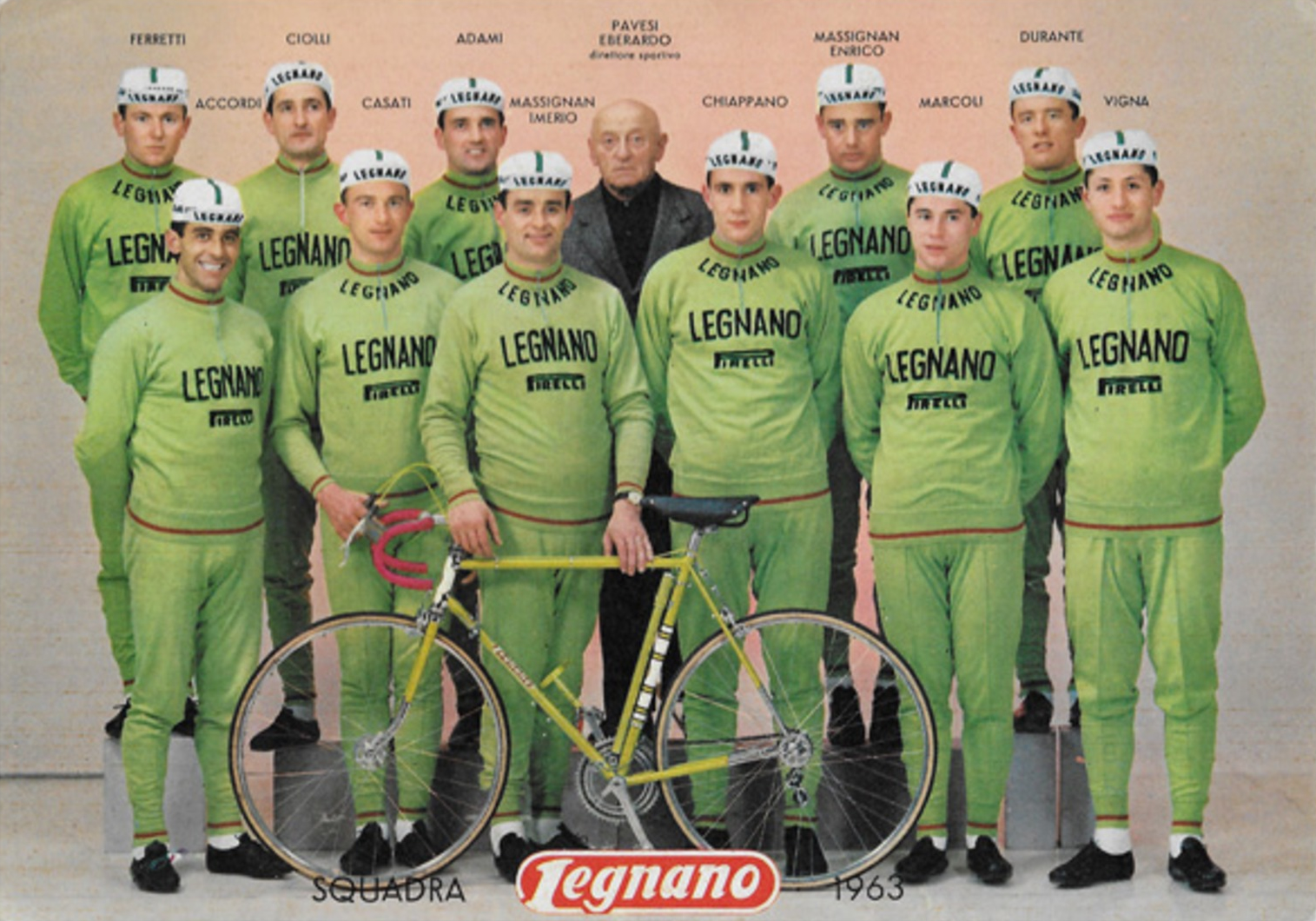
- The Legnano team of 1963

Team information
- Founded: 1906
- Disbanded: 1966
- Discipline: Road
- Bicycles: Legnano

Team name history
- 1906–1908 1909 1910–1918 1919–1927 1928–1929 1930 1931–1932 1933 1934 1935–1936 1937–1945 1946–1951 1952 1953 1954–1958 1959 1960–1961 1962 1963–1965 1966: Legnano; Legnano–Pirelli; Legnano; Legnano–Pirelli; Legnano–Torpedo; Legnano–Pirelli; Legnano–Hutchinson; Legnano–Clément; Legnano; Legnano–Wolsit; Legnano; Legnano–Pirelli; Legnano; Legnano–Pirelli; Legnano; Legnano–Pirelli; Legnano; Legnano–Pirelli; Legnano; Legnano–Pirelli
Jersey

Legnano was an Italian professional cycling team active from 1906 to 1966. It is ranked as the 6th most successful cycling team in history. Many famous cyclists rode for the team including Alfredo Binda, Learco Guerra, Gino Bartali and Fausto Coppi. The team participated in the Giro d'Italia 46 times, won the team classification 11 times and earned 135 stage wins. It was sponsored by Italian bicycle motorcycle manufacturer Legnano.

== Major results ==
1906
No recorded wins

1907
No recorded wins

1908
Stage 4 Giro di Sicilia, Pierino Albini

1909
Stages 1 & 8 Giro d'Italia, Dario Beni
Stage 3 & 6 Giro d'Italia, Giovanni Rossignoli
Roma, Dario Beni
Italy National Road Race Championships, Dario Beni

1910
Giro della Romagna, Jean-Baptiste Dortignacq
Paris–Brussels, Maurice Brocco
France National Road Race Championships, Émile Georget
Bordeaux–Paris, Émile Georget
Stage 1 Giro d'Italia, Ernesto Azzini
Stage 2 Giro d'Italia, Jean-Baptiste Dortignacq
Stage 4 Giro d'Italia, Pierino Albini
Stage 3 Tour de France, Émile Georget
Stage 15 Tour de France, Ernesto Azzini
Coppa Val d'Olona, Henri Lignon
Imola, Luigi Azzini
Savona, Ernesto Azzini

1911
Stage 2 Giro d'Italia, Vincenzo Borgarello
Bologna, Clemente Canepari

1912
Stages 2, 7, & 9 Giro d'Italia, Vincenzo Borgarello
Stage 3 Giro d'Italia, Ernesto Azzini
Stages 8 & 14 Tour de France, Vincenzo Borgarello
Corsa del Commercio, Ernesto Azzini

1913
Milano–Torino, Giuseppe Azzini
Stages 2 & 9 Giro d'Italia, Eberardo Pavesi
Stages 4 & 5 Giro d'Italia, Giuseppe Azzini
Stage 7 Giro d'Italia, Clemente Canepari
Belgium National Road Race Championships, Joseph Vandaele
Tour du Hainaut, Joseph Vandaele

1914
Stages 7 & 8 Giro d'Italia, Pierino Albini

1919
Tour of Flanders, Henri Van Lerberghe
Gran Fondo, La Seicento, Alfredo Sivocci
Italy National Track Championships (Individual Pursuit), Carlo Galetti
Overall Roma–Napoli–Roma, Alfredo Sivocci

Stages 1 & 2, Alfredo Sivocci

Hooglede, Henri Van Lerberghe
Ham-sur-Heure, Lucien Buysse

1920
Stage 5 Giro d'Italia, Leopoldo Torricelli
Giro dell'Emilia, Giovanni Brunero

1921
Giro del Piemonte, Giovanni Brunero
Overall Giro d'Italia, Giovanni Brunero

Stage 7, Giovanni Brunero

Tour du lac Léman, Franco Giorgetti

1922
Milan–San Remo, Giovanni Brunero
Overall Giro d'Italia, Giovanni Brunero

Stage 4, Alfredo Sivocci
Stages 5 & 9, Bartolomeo Aimo
Stage 6, Pietro Linari
Stages 7 & 10, Giovanni Brunero
Stage 8, Luigi Annoni

Giro del Veneto, Alfredo Sivocci
Overall Giro della Provincia Milano, Giovanni Brunero

1923
Giro della Romagna, Giovanni Brunero
Stage 9 Giro d'Italia, Alfredo Sivocci
Coppa Cavacciocchi, Giuseppe Enrici
Milano–Modena, Pietro Linari
Giro di Lombardia, Giovanni Brunero

1925
Overall Giro d'Italia, Alfredo Binda

Stage 1, Pietro Linari
Stage 6, Alfredo Binda
Stage 8, Giovanni Brunero

Giro della Toscana, Nello Ciaccheri
Giro di Lombardia, Alfredo Binda

1926
Giro del Piemonte, Alfredo Binda
Overall Giro d'Italia, Giovanni Brunero

Stages 3, 6, 7, 9, 11 & 12, Alfredo Binda
Stage 8, Giovanni Brunero

Imola–San Marino, Ermanno Vallazza
Giro della Toscana, Alfredo Binda
Roma–Napoli–Roma, Alfredo Binda
Milano–Modena, Alfredo Binda
Giro di Lombardia, Alfredo Binda
Italy National Road Race Championships, Alfredo Binda
Six Days of New York City, Six Days (a), Pietro Linari

1927
Giro del Piemonte, Alfredo Binda
Overall Giro d'Italia, Alfredo Binda

Stages 1, 2, 3, 5, 6, 7, 8, 9, 10, 12, 14 & 15, Alfredo Binda
Stage 13, Giovanni Brunero

Giro della Toscana, Alfredo Binda
UCI Road World Championships, Road Race, Alfredo Binda
Giro di Lombardia, Alfredo Binda
Italy National Road Race Championships, Alfredo Binda

1928
Rund um Köln, Alfredo Binda
Overall Giro d'Italia, Alfredo Binda

Stages 2, 3, 4, 5, 10 & 11, Alfredo Binda

Predappio Alta–Roma, Alfredo Binda
Giro del Veneto, Alfredo Binda
Italy National Road Race Championships, Alfredo Binda
Tre Valli Varesine, Battista Visconti
Overall Giro della Provincia di Reggio Calabria, Felice Gremo

1929
Stage 1 Giro di Sicilia, Albino Binda
Six Days of Dortmund, Alfredo Dinale
Milan–San Remo, Alfredo Binda
Giro della Romagna, Alfredo Binda
Overall Giro d'Italia, Alfredo Binda

Stages 2, 3, 4, 5, 6, 7, 8 & 9, Alfredo Binda
Stages 10 & 13, Mario Bianchi
Stages 11 & 14, Alfredo Dinale

Predappio Alta–Roma, Alfredo Binda
Italy National Road Race Championships, Alfredo Binda

1930
Overall Giro d'Italia, Luigi Marchisio

Stages 2 & 14, Leonida Frascarelli
Stages 3 & 4, Luigi Marchisio

Stages 8 & 9 Tour de France, Alfredo Binda
UCI Road World Championships, Road Race, Alfredo Binda
Tre Valli Varesine, Albino Binda

1931
Milan–San Remo, Alfredo Binda
Stages 3 & 4 Giro d'Italia, Alfredo Binda
Stage 14 Tour de France, Eugenio Gestri
Giro del Veneto, Aldo Canazza
Predappio Alta–Roma, Eugenio Gestri
Giro di Lombardia, Alfredo Binda

1932
Stage 11 Giro d'Italia, Remo Bertoni
UCI Road World Championships, Road Race, Alfredo Binda

1933
Overall Giro d'Italia, Alfredo Binda

Mountains classification, Alfredo Binda
Stages 2, 8, 9, 10, 13 & 17, Alfredo Binda

Stage 1 Tour de Suisse, Luigi Macchi

1934
Italy National Cyclo-cross Championships, Severino Canavesi
Cittiglio–Leffe, Remo Bertoni
Stage 15 Giro d'Italia, Fabio Battesini
Stage 2 Giro del Lazio, Antonio Andretta
Stages 3 & 4 Giro del Lazio, Adalino Mealli
Stage 6 Tour de Suisse, Adalino Mealli
Tre Valli Varesine, Severino Canavesi

1935
Stage 3 Paris–Nice, Henri Puppo
Milano–Torino, Giovanni Gotti
Cremona, Fabio Battesini
Stage 7 Tour de France, Francesco Camusso
Stage 5 Tour de Suisse, Adalino Mealli
Giro della Provincia Milano, Fabio Battesini

1936
Nice–Mont Agel, Luigi Barral
Overall Giro d'Italia, Gino Bartali

Mountains classification, Gino Bartali
Stage 4, Fabio Battesini
Stages 9, 17b & 18, Gino Bartali

Stage 2 Giro del Lazio, Adalino Mealli
Giro di Lombardia, Gino Bartali

1937
Overall Giro d'Italia, Gino Bartali

Mountains classification, Gino Bartali
Stage 5a (TTT)
Stages 8a, 10, 16 & 17, Gino Bartali
Stage 8b, Raffaele Di Paco
Stage 9, Learco Guerra

Stage 7 Tour de France, Gino Bartali
Giro della Romagna, Osvaldo Bailo
Italy National Road Race Championships, Gino Bartali
Giro del Piemonte, Gino Bartali

1938

Milano–Torino, Pierino Favalli
Tre Valli Varesine, Gino Bartali
Giro della Romagna, Pierino Favalli
Overall Tour de France, Gino Bartali

Mountains classification, Gino Bartali
Stages 11 & 14, Gino Bartali

Busto Arsizio, Secondo Magni
Giro del Veneto, Secondo Magni

1939
Milano–Torino, Pierino Favalli
Milan–San Remo, Gino Bartali
Giro della Toscana, Gino Bartali
Mountains classification Giro d'Italia, Gino Bartali

Stages 2, 9b, 15 & 17, Gino Bartali
Stage 14, Secondo Magni

Giro del Piemonte, Gino Bartali
Memorial Fausto Coppi, Fausto Coppi
Giro di Lombardia, Gino Bartali

1940
Stage 2 GP Leptis-Magna, Gino Bartali
Milano–Torino, Pierino Favalli
Milan–San Remo, Gino Bartali
Giro della Toscana, Gino Bartali
Overall Giro d'Italia, Fausto Coppi

Mountains classification, Gino Bartali
Stage 2, Pierino Favalli
Stage 9, Primo Volpi
Stage 11, Fausto Coppi
Stages 17 & 19, Gino Bartali

Giro di Campania, Gino Bartali
Giro del Lazio, Gino Bartali
Giro di Lombardia, Gino Bartali
Italy National Road Race Championships, Gino Bartali

1941
Milan–San Remo, Pierino Favalli
Giro della Toscana, Fausto Coppi
Giro del Veneto, Fausto Coppi
Giro dell'Emilia, Fausto Coppi
Tre Valli Varesine, Fausto Coppi
Giro di Lombardia, Mario Ricci

1942
Milano–Torino, Pietro Chiappini
Italy National Road Race Championships, Fausto Coppi
Giro del Veneto, Pierino Favalli
Giro di Campania, Pierino Favalli
World hour record, Fausto Coppi

1943
Italy National Road Race Championships, Mario Ricci

1944
No recorded wins

1945
Pescara, Mario Ricci
Overall Giro del Lazio, Gino Bartali

Stage 1, Gino Bartali
Stage 2, Mario Ricci

Giro di Campania, Gino Bartali
Giro di Lombardia, Mario Ricci

1946
Circuito di San Rocco di Larciano (b), Aldo Bini
Trofeo Matteotti, Gino Bartali
Kampioenschap van Zürich, Gino Bartali
Overall Giro d'Italia, Gino Bartali

Mountains classification, Gino Bartali
Stage 5b, Aldo Bini
Stage 7, Mario Ricci
Stage 10, Renzo Zanazzi

Overall Tour de Suisse, Gino Bartali

Stages 1, 5, 6 & 8, Gino Bartali
Stage 2, Renzo Zanazzi

GP Jurassia, Gino Bartali
Marchienne-au-Pont, Gino Bartali

1947
Milan–San Remo, Gino Bartali
Giro della Toscana, Bruno Pasquini
Stage 3b Tour de Romandie, Gino Bartali
Stage 4a Tour de Romandie, Mario Ricci
Mountains classification Giro d'Italia, Gino Bartali

Stages 1 & 5b, Renzo Zanazzi
Stages 2 & 15, Gino Bartali
Stage 10, Mario Ricci

Overall Tour de Suisse, Gino Bartali

Stages 1c & 2, Gino Bartali

1948
GP Alghero, Adolfo Leoni
Giro della Toscana, Gino Bartali
Kampioenschap van Zürich, Gino Bartali
Stage 2 Giro d'Italia, Mario Ricci
Stages 5 & 8 Giro d'Italia, Adolfo Leoni
Stage 13 Giro d'Italia, Bruno Pasquini
Stage 15 Giro d'Italia, Vincenzo Rossello
Overall Tour de France, Gino Bartali

Mountains classification, Gino Bartali
Stages 1, 7, 8, 13, 14, 15 & 19, Gino Bartali
Stage 2, Vincenzo Rossello
Stages 18 & 21, Giovanni Corrieri

Blankenberge, Giovanni Corrieri
Bertrix, Gino Bartali
Milano–Rapallo, Enzo Nannini
Coppa Bernocchi, Virgilio Salimbeni

1949
Giro del Piemonte, Adolfo Leoni
Stages 7, 9 & 13 Giro d'Italia, Adolfo Leoni
Stage 14 Giro d'Italia, Vincenzo Rossello
Medaglia d'Oro Città di Monza, Giorgio Albani
Stage 18 Tour de France, Vincenzo Rossello
Imola–San Marino, Renzo Soldani
Giro dell'Emilia, Virgilio Salimbeni

1950
Stage 11 Giro d'Italia, Adolfo Leoni
Stage 2 Tour de France, Adolfo Leoni
Giro dell'Appennino, Renzo Soldani
Coppa Agostoni, Giorgio Albani
Giro di Lombardia, Renzo Soldani
Stage 1 Giro di Sicilia, Giorgio Albani

1951
Sassari–Cagliari, Renzo Soldani
Stage 10 Giro d'Italia, Giuseppe Minardi
Stage 14 Giro d'Italia, Adolfo Leoni
Stage 16 Giro d'Italia, Luciano Frosini
Trofeo Baracchi, Giuseppe Minardi

1952
Giro di Campania, Giuseppe Minardi
Ceprano, Umberto Drei
Stages 1 & 7 Giro d'Italia, Giorgio Albani
Stage 8 Giro d'Italia, Rino Benedetti
Stage 15 Giro d'Italia, Giuseppe Minardi
Stage 17 Giro d'Italia, Nino Defilippis
Giro dell'Appennino, Giorgio Albani
Tre Valli Varesine, Giuseppe Minardi
Italy National Road Race Championships, Giuseppe Minardi
Giro del Piemonte, Giorgio Albani
Giro di Lombardia, Giuseppe Minardi
Trofeo Baracchi, Nino Defilippis

1953
Staged 3b & 4 Giro di Sicilia, Rino Benedetti
Stage 1b Roma–Napoli–Roma, Giorgio Albani
Stage 2a Roma–Napoli–Roma, Giuseppe Minardi
Stage 6 Giro d'Italia, Giuseppe Minardi
Stage 12 Giro d'Italia, Giorgio Albani
Giro del Lazio, Giorgio Albani
Grottarossa, Giorgio Albani
GP Industria e Commercio di Prato, Rino Benedetti
Coppa Bernocchi, Giorgio Albani
Tre Valli Varesine, Nino Defilippis

1954
Stage 1b Roma–Napoli–Roma, Giorgio Albani
Giro della Romagna, Giuseppe Minardi
Stage 2 Giro d'Italia, Giuseppe Minardi
Stage 7 Giro d'Italia, Giorgio Albani
Coppa Kaiser, Tranquillo Scudellaro
Giro dell'Appennino, Giorgio Albani
Tre Valli Varesine, Giorgio Albani
Stages 6a & 6b Tour of Belgium, Pietro Nascimbene
Coppa Sabatini, Rino Benedetti

1955
Stage 11 Giro d'Italia, Vincenzo Zucconelli
Stage 13 Giro d'Italia, Giorgio Albani
Stage 14 Giro d'Italia, Giuseppe Minardi
Giro del Piemonte, Giuseppe Minardi

1956
Sassari - Cagliari, Nello Fabbri
Stage 1 Giro di Sicilia, Vincenzo Zucconelli
Stage 1a Roma–Napoli–Roma, Vincenzo Zucconelli
Stages 16 & 20 Giro d'Italia, Giorgio Albani
Giro della Toscana, Nello Fabbri
Giro del Veneto, Giorgio Albani
GP von Basel, Giorgio Albani
Italy National Road Race Championships, Giorgio Albani

1957
Giro di Campania, Giorgio Albani
Stage 12 Giro d'Italia, Ercole Baldini
Giro della Romagna, Ercole Baldini
Giro del Lazio, Ercole Baldini
Italy National Road Race Championships, Ercole Baldini
Lugano Chrono, Ercole Baldini
Trofeo Baracchi, Ercole Baldini

1958
Stages 3b & 6a Roma–Napoli–Roma, Ercole Baldini
Castrocaro Terme, Ercole Baldini
Overall Giro d'Italia, Ercole Baldini

Stages 2, 8, 15 & 17, Ercole Baldini

UCI Road World Championships, Road Race, Ercole Baldini
Italy National Road Race Championships, Ercole Baldini
Trofeo Baracchi, Ercole Baldini

1959
No recorded wins

1960
Milano–Torino, Arnaldo Pambianco
Mountains classification Tour de France, Imerio Massignan

Stages 7 & 16, Graziano Battistini

Coppa Sabatini, Graziano Battistini

1961
Stage 4 Roma–Napoli–Roma, Graziano Battistini
Mountains classification Tour de France, Imerio Massignan

Stage 16, Imerio Massignan

Coppa Agostoni, Giovanni Bettinelli

1962
Stage 2 Giro d'Italia, Graziano Battistini

1963

Giro di Campania, Adriano Durante
Stage 8 Giro d'Italia, Adriano Durante
Stage 14 Giro d'Italia, Marino Vigna
Giro del Piemonte, Adriano Durante
Milano–Vignola, Adriano Durante
Stages 1 & 5 Giro della Valle d’Aosta, Silvio Boni
Giro del Lazio, Adriano Durante

1964
Stage 11 Giro d'Italia, Raffaele Marcoli
Giro della Romagna, Adriano Durante

1965
Giro della Toscana, Luciano Sambi

1966
No recorded wins
