= Ezio Corlaita =

Italian cyclist

Personal information
- Born: 25 October 1889 Bologna, Italy
- Died: 20 September 1967 (aged 77) Bologna, Italy

Cycling career
- Sport: Cycling
- Discipline: Road
- Role: Rider

Major wins
- Grand Tours Giro d'Italia 3 individual stages (1911, 1919) One-day races and Classics Milan–San Remo (1915) Giro dell'Emilia (1914) Milano–Modena (1913)

Ezio Corlaita (25 October 1889 – 20 September 1967) was an Italian professional racing cyclist. He notably won the 1915 Milan–San Remo and three stages of the Giro d'Italia, in 1911 and 1919. He also won the 1914 Giro dell'Emilia and the 1913 Milano–Modena.

== Major results ==
1908
10th Milano–Modena
1910
4th Overall Giro d'Italia
1911
5th Overall Giro d'Italia

1st Stages 9 & 12

5th Giro dell'Emilia
6th Giro di Romagna
1912
4th Milan–San Remo
1913
1st Milano–Modena
2nd Giro dell'Emilia
2nd Giro di Campania
3rd Milan–San Remo
3rd Giro di Romagna
3rd Milano–Torino
1914
1st Giro dell'Emilia
1915
1st Milan–San Remo
4th Milano–Torino
1917
7th Milan–San Remo
1918
4th Milan–San Remo
8th Giro dell'Emilia
1919
2nd Giro dell'Emilia
7th Overall Giro d'Italia

1st Stage 4

7th Gran Piemonte
1921
8th Milano–Modena
