= 1923 Milan–San Remo =

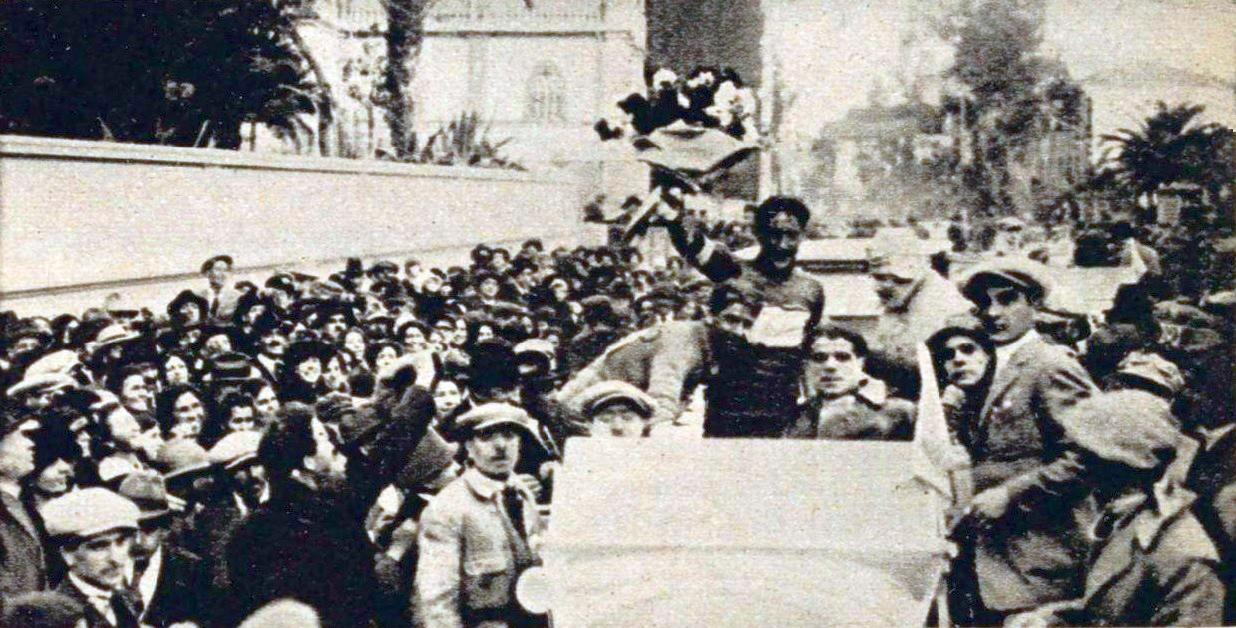
- Costante Girardengo is honored for his win

Race details
- Dates: 25 March 1923
- Stages: 1
- Distance: 286.5 km (178.0 mi)
- Winning time: 10h 14' 00"

Results
	Winner	Costante Girardengo (ITA)
	Second	Gaetano Belloni (ITA)
	Third	Giuseppe Azzini (ITA)

The 1923 Milan–San Remo was the 16th edition of the Milan–San Remo cycle race and was held on 25 March 1923. The race started in Milan and finished in San Remo. The race was won by Costante Girardengo, his third of six wins.

== General classification ==
Final general classification

Rank	Rider	Time
1	Costante Girardengo (ITA)	10h 14' 00"
2	Gaetano Belloni (ITA)	+ 0"
3	Giuseppe Azzini (ITA)	+ 0"
4	Giovanni Brunero (ITA)	+ 0"
5	Pietro Bestetti (ITA)	+ 0"
6	Bartolomeo Aimo (ITA)	+ 0"
7	Camillo Arduino (ITA)	+ 0"
8	Angelo Gremo (ITA)	+ 0"
9	Ottavio Bottecchia (ITA)	+ 0"
10	Luigi Lucotti (ITA)	+ 0"
