= 1919 Giro di Lombardia =

Race details
- Dates: 2 November 1919
- Stages: 1
- Distance: 256 km (159.1 mi)
- Winning time: 9h 42' 01"

Results
	Winner	Costante Girardengo (ITA)
	Second	Gaetano Belloni (ITA)
	Third	Heiri Suter (SUI)

The 1919 Giro di Lombardia was the 15th edition of the Giro di Lombardia cycle race and was held on 2 November 1919. The race started and finished in Milan. The race was won by Costante Girardengo.

== General classification ==
Final general classification

Rank	Rider	Team	Time
1	Costante Girardengo (ITA)		9h 42' 01"
2	Gaetano Belloni (ITA)	Bianchi-Pirelli	+ 8' 00"
3	Heiri Suter (SUI)		+ 23' 00"
4	Ugo Agostoni (ITA)	Bianchi-Pirelli	+ 35' 00"
5	Max Suter (SUI)		+ 49' 00"
6	Giovanni Roncon (ITA)		+ 1h 23' 00"
7	Domenico Schierano (ITA)		+ 1h 41' 00"
8	Antonio de Michiel (ITA)		+ 3h 32' 00"
