= Giuseppe Azzini =

Italian cyclist

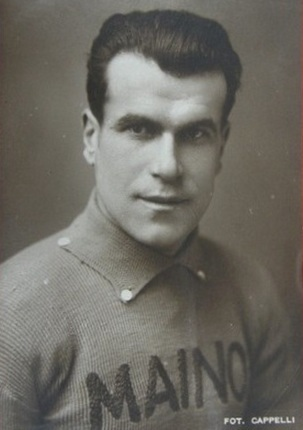
- Giuseppe Azzini in 1911

Personal information
- Born: 26 March 1891 Gazzuolo, Italy
- Died: 11 November 1925 (aged 34) Ospedaletti, Italy

Cycling career
- Sport: Cycling
- Role: Rider

Professional teams
- 1910–1912: Legnano
- 1913: Otav
- 1914–1915: Bianchi–Dei
- 1919: Legnano–Pirelli
- 1920: Bianchi
- 1921: Stucchi–Pirelli
- 1922–1924: Maino–Bergougnan

Major wins
- Grand Tours Giro d'Italia 4 individual stages (1913, 1914) One-day races and Classics Milano-Torino (1913) National Road Race Championships (1912)

Giuseppe Azzini (26 March 1891 – 11 November 1925) was an Italian racing cyclist. He won two stages of the 1913 Giro d'Italia and finished third overall.

== Career ==
Azzini's best race of his career was the 1913 Giro d'Italia. The following year he tried to repeat his performance. He achieved two stage wins in a row and a day in the race lead. In the final kilometres of the sixth stage Azzini disappeared. The organisers sent search parties out looking for the following day and he was found sleeping in a barn. That was his race over. 90 percent of the riders who started the Giro did not finish.

== Major results ==
1911
1st Overall Giro dell'Umbria
1st Amateur Road race championship
1912 (1 Pro win)
1st National road race championship
1913 (3)
1st Milano-Torino
3rd Overall Giro d'Italia

1st Stages 4 & 5
Held lead after stage 7

4th Giro della Romagna
1914 (2)
Giro d'Italia

1st Stages 4 & 5
Held lead after stage 5

2nd Giro di Lombardia
2nd Milano-Torino
3rd National road race championship
8th Giro dell'Emilia
1915
5th Milan–San Remo
1918
6th Giro di Lombardia
1919
2nd Overall Roma–Napoli–Roma
3rd Milano-Torino
3rd National road race championship
4th Milan–San Remo
1920 (1)
1st Giro della Provincia Milano
2nd Milano–Modena
4th Milan–San Remo
4th Giro di Lombardia
4th National road race championship
8th Paris–Roubaix
1921 (1)
1st Giro della Provincia Milano
2nd Genoa–Nice
2nd Giro del Piemonte
3rd Milan–San Remo
3rd Nice - Mont Agel
4th Overall Roma–Napoli–Roma
5th Milano-Torino
1922
2nd Giro di Lombardia
2nd Giro della Provincia Milano
5th Giro del Piemonte
6th Giro della Romagna
1923
2nd Overall Roma–Napoli–Roma
3rd Milan–San Remo
5th Giro di Toscana
1924
8th Giro del Veneto

=== General classification results timeline ===
Grand Tour general classification results
Grand Tour	1910	1911	1912	1913	1914	1915	1916	1917	1918	1919	1920	1921	1922
Vuelta a España	Race did not exist												
Giro d'Italia	—	—	—	3	DNF	Races not held due to World War I				DNF	DNF	DNF	DNF
Tour de France	—	—	—	—	—	Races not held due to World War I				—	—	—	—

Legend
—	Did not compete
DNF	Did not finish
