= 1917 Milan–San Remo =

Race details
- Dates: 15 April 1917
- Stages: 1
- Distance: 286.5 km (178.0 mi)
- Winning time: 12h 44' 09"

Results
	Winner	Gaetano Belloni (ITA)
	Second	Costante Girardengo (ITA)
	Third	Angelo Gremo (ITA)

The 1917 Milan–San Remo was the tenth edition of the Milan–San Remo cycle race and was held on 15 April 1917. The race started in Milan and finished in San Remo. The race was won by Gaetano Belloni.

== General classification ==
Final general classification

Rank	Rider	Time
1	Gaetano Belloni (ITA)	12h 44' 09"
2	Costante Girardengo (ITA)	+ 11' 48"
3	Angelo Gremo (ITA)	+ 42' 21"
4	Camillo Bertarelli (ITA)	+ 42' 21"
5	Luigi Cuppi (ITA)	+ 42' 21"
6	Pietro Bestetti (ITA)	+ 42' 21"
7	Ezio Corlaita (ITA)	+ 55' 41"
8	Francesco Ceruti (ITA)	+ 56' 54"
9	Leopoldo Torricelli (ITA)	+ 1h 12' 00"
10	Michele Robotti (ITA)	+ 1h 19' 00"
