= Luigi Vertemati =

Italian cyclist

Personal information
- Born: 11 March 1891
- Died: 15 October 1976 (aged 85)

Cycling career
- Sport: Cycling
- Role: Rider

Luigi Vertemati (11 March 1891 – 15 October 1976) was an Italian racing cyclist. He rode in the 1922 Tour de France.
