= Costante Girardengo =

Italian cyclist

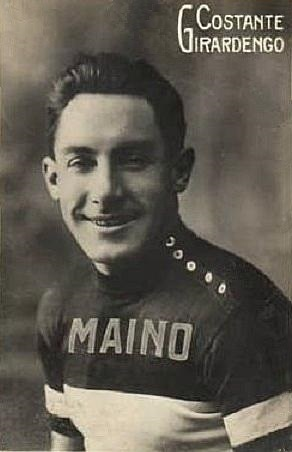
- Girardengo in 1920

Personal information
- Full name: Costante Girardengo
- Nickname: Campionissimo No.1
- Born: 18 March 1893 Novi Ligure, Italy
- Died: 9 February 1978 (aged 84) Cassano Spinola, Italy

Cycling career
- Sport: Cycling
- Discipline: Road
- Role: Rider

Professional teams
- 1912–1913: Maino
- 1914: Automoto-Continental/Maino
- 1915–1918: Bianchi
- 1919–1921: Stucchi
- 1922: Bianchi
- 1923: Maino/Gürtner-Hutchinson
- 1924: Maino
- 1925–1927: Wolsit-Pirelli
- 1928: Maino/Opel-Torpado
- 1929–1932: Maino
- 1933: Maino/Girardengo-Clément
- 1934–1936: Maino

Major wins
- Grand Tours Giro d'Italia General classification (1919, 1923) 30 stages One-day races and Classics National Road Race Championships (1913, 1914, 1919, 1920, 1921, 1922, 1923, 1924, 1925) Milan–San Remo (1918, 1921, 1923, 1925, 1926, 1928) Giro di Lombardia (1919, 1921, 1922) Milano-Torino (1914, 1915, 1919, 1920, 1923)
Medal record
Representing Italy
Men's road bicycle racing
World Championships
Silver medal – second place	1927 Nürburgring	Elite Men's Road Race

Costante Girardengo (Italian pronunciation: [koˈstante dʒirarˈdeŋɡo]; 18 March 1893 – 9 February 1978) was an Italian professional road bicycle racer, considered by many to be one of the finest riders in the history of the sport. He was the first rider to be declared a "Campionissimo" or "champion of champions" by the Italian media and fans. At the height of his career, in the 1920s, he was said to be more popular than Mussolini and it was decreed that all express trains should stop in his home town Novi Ligure, an honour only normally awarded to heads of state.

His career achievements include two wins in the Giro d'Italia, six wins in Milan–San Remo, three wins in the Giro di Lombardia; he was also Italian road race champion on nine occasions. His professional career was extensive, lasting from 1912 to 1936 and was interrupted by World War I which robbed Girardengo of some of his best years. He was ranked number one in the World in 1919, 1922, 1923, 1925 and 1926. He raced almost exclusively in his home country as was the custom in those days, as foreign travel was not easy. Girardengo was of only small stature and this earned him the nickname "The Novi Runt".

== Career ==
Born in Novi Ligure (province of Alessandria, Piedmont), Costante Girardengo turned professional in 1913 at the age of 20 for the Maino-Dunlop team after impressing as an amateur the previous year by finishing runner up in the Tour of Tuscany. He met with immediate success winning a stage in the Giro d'Italia (his first of 30 stage wins in the Giro) and becoming Italian road race champion. He repeated these successes in 1914 and also took his first of his five wins in Milano–Torino. 1914 saw Girardengo win the longest ever stage in the Giro d'Italia, a 430 kilometre leg between Lucca and Rome. Later that same year Girardengo took part in the Tour de France for the only time in his career, riding as a guest for the Automoto team he crashed several times in stages five and six and abandoned the race. 1915 saw him take another win in Milano–Torino but Milan–San Remo resulted in disappointment when he was disqualified after winning the race for going off course.

Much of the professional cycle racing was stopped after 1915 because of the First World War and it was not until 1918 that Girardengo took another win, taking the first of his six victories in Milan–San Remo, a record which Eddy Merckx eventually eclipsed over 50 years later. He also finished in the first three of the same race every year from 1917 to 1926 and was first over the Turchino Pass on five occasions. His post 1918 form was all the more remarkable as during the First World War Girardengo had contracted Spanish flu and nearly died, his manager believing a survivor of that disease could not race properly refused at one point to renew his licence.

Girardengo took the first of his Giro d'Italia wins in 1919 (including seven stage wins), however his form in the Giro was not always good and he abandoned the race in the early stages in 1920, 1921 and 1922 before dominating in 1923. 1923 was undoubtedly Girardengo's best year with 16 victories, he took his second Giro d'Italia win including eight of the ten stages as well as many of the top Italian one day races. Despite racing in Italy for most of his career, Girardengo had a burning desire to win Paris–Roubaix, he first raced there in 1921 but he was unlucky on several occasions, breaking his bike when well placed and never coming close to winning. In 1924 Girardengo won the GP Wolber in France, then regarded as the unofficial World Championship.

Girardengo finished runner up in the inaugural World Championship road race held on the Nürburgring in Germany in 1927, the four man Italian team also included Alfredo Binda, Gaetano Belloni and Domenico Piemontesi, the Italians worked perfectly as a team with Binda breaking away 20 miles from the finish to win comfortably, the Italians filled the first four places on that rainy day in Germany. He took his sixth win in Milan–San Remo in 1928 and this was his last big victory on the road although he continued riding until the 1936 season when he retired at the age of 43.

After his retirement Girardengo became involved as a coach of the professional Maino team. He also became the head coach of the Italian national squad for a time, advising Gino Bartali when he won the 1938 Tour de France. Later on he gave his name "Girardengo" to a brand of motorbikes manufactured between 1951 and 1954 in the northern Italian city of Alessandria.

He has been immortalised in Italian popular culture through the critically acclaimed song "Il Bandito e il Campione" by Francesco De Gregori that juxtaposes his life with that of his childhood friend the notorious bandit and outlaw Sante Pollastro.

He died in 1978 at Cassano Spinola, just outside Novi Ligure, at the age of 84.

== Major results ==
1912
1st Coppa de Bagni di Casciana
1913
1st Road race, National Road Championships
1st Stage 6 Giro d'Italia
1st Overall Corsa XX Septembre

1st Stage 2

1st Coppa Borzino
1st Gran Fondo
1914
1st Road race, National Road Championships
1st Stage 3 Giro d'Italia
1st Milano–Torino
2nd Overall Giro della Romagna
2nd Giro dell'Emilia
1915
1st Milano–Torino
1917
2nd Milan–San Remo
2nd Overall Giro della Provincia Milan (with Angelo Gremo)
2nd Milan-Bellagio-Varèse
1918
1st Milan–San Remo
1st Giro dell'Emilia
1st Serravalle-Arquata
1st Turin-Arquata (with Gaetano Belloni, Lauro Bordin, and Luigi Lucotti)
2nd Milan-Varèse
1919
1st Road race, National Road Championships
1st Overall Giro d'Italia

1st Stages 1, 2, 6, 7, 8, 9, & 10

1st Giro di Lombardia
1st Milan-Modène
1st Milano–Torino
1st Giro dell'Emilia
1st Giro del Piemonte
1st Overall Giro della Provincia Milan (with Angelo Gremo)
1st Overall Rome-Trente-Trieste

1st Stages 1, 2, & 3

2nd Milan–San Remo
1920
1st Road race, National Road Championships
1st Milan-Modène
1st Giro del Piemonte
1st Milano–Torino
1st Turin-Gênes
2nd Giro dell'Emilia
2nd Milan-San Pellegrino
2nd Overall Giro della Provincia Milan (with Annoni)
3rd Milan–San Remo
1921
1st Road race, National Road Championships
1st Milan–San Remo
1st Giro di Lombardia
Giro d'Italia

1st Stages 1, 2, 3, & 4

1st Giro dell'Emilia
1st Milan-San Pellegrino
1st Genoa–Nice
1st Overall Corsa XX Septembre
1st Overall Giro della Provincia Milan (with Giuseppe Azzini)
2nd Milan-Modène
1922
1st Road race, National Road Championships
1st Giro di Lombardia
1st Overall Corsa XX Septembre
1st Giro dell'Emilia
1st Giro di Romagna
1st Tour du Lac Leman
1st Critérium de Genève
1st Tour des Deux Golfes
1st Giro della Provincia de Milan (with Belloni)
1st Stage 2 Giro d'Italia
2nd Milan–San Remo
1923
1st Road race, National Road Championships
1st Overall Giro d'Italia

1st Stages 1, 3, 4, 5, 6, 7, 8, & 10

1st Milan–San Remo
1st Overall Corsa XX Septembre
1st Milano–Torino
1st Giro del Veneto
1st Giro di Toscana
1st Giro de la Province de Turin (with Giovanni Brunero)
1924
1st Road race, National Road Championships
1st Giro del Piemonte
1st Giro del Veneto
1st Giro di Toscana
1st GP Wolber
1st G.P Milazzo
2nd Giro di Lombardia
3rd Milan–San Remo
1925
1st Road race, National Road Championships
1st Milan–San Remo
1st Critérium National
1st Giro del Veneto
1st Overall Corsa XX Septembre
1st Giro dell'Emilia
1st G.P Milazzo
1st Overall Giro de la Province de Milan (with Ottavio Bottecchia)

1st Stage 1

2nd Overall Giro d'Italia

1st Stages 2, 4, 7, 9, 10, & 11

2nd Critérium des As à Turin
1926
1st Milan–San Remo
1st Giro di Romagna
1st Giro del Veneto
Giro d'Italia

1st Stages 4 & 5

2nd Giro di Toscana
3rd Giro del Piemonte
3rd Critérium de Genève
1927
1st 6 Days of Milan (with Alfredo Binda)
2nd Professional road race, UCI Road World Championships
2nd G.P de Turin
1928
1st Milan–San Remo
1st Milan-Modène
1st 6 Days of Milan (with Pietro Linari)
1st 6 Days of Breslau (with Willy Rieger)
1st 6 Days of Leipzig (with Antonio Negrini)
1929
2nd 6 Days of Paris (with Pietro Linari)
1930
5th Milan–San Remo
1932
2nd Overall Giro de la Province de Milan (with Learco Guerra)
1935
1st Stage 3 Giro delle Quattro
2nd Asti-Ceriale
3rd Circuit Apuan
3rd Circuit d'Imola

== See also ==
- Legends of Italian sport - Walk of Fame
