= Angelo Gremo =

Italian cyclist

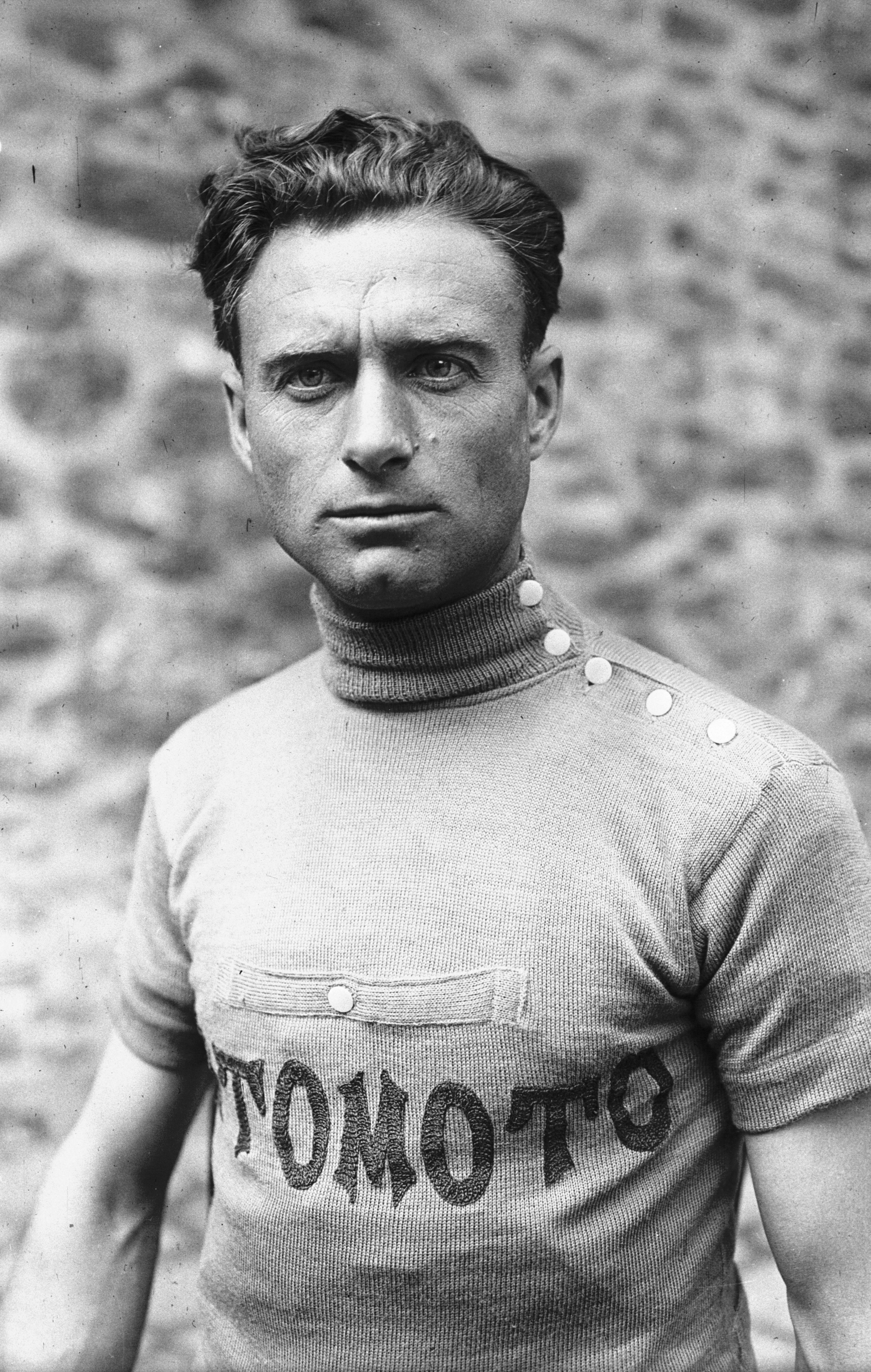
- Gremo in 1922

Personal information
- Full name: Angelo Gremo
- Born: 3 December 1887 Turin, Italy
- Died: 4 September 1940 (aged 52) Turin, Italy

Cycling career
- Sport: Cycling
- Discipline: Road
- Role: Rider

Professional teams
- 1911: Fiat
- 1912–1913: Peugeot
- 1913: Griffon-Continental
- 1914: Peugeot
- 1914: Automoto
- 1914: Ganna-dunlop
- 1915: Bianchi
- 1916: Maino
- 1917: Bianchi
- 1918: Dei
- 1919: Stucchi - Dunlop
- 1920–1922: Bianchi - Pirelli
- 1923–1924: Maino
- 1925–1926: Meteore - Wolber

Major wins
- Grand Tours Giro d'Italia 2 individual stages (1914, 1920) One-day races and Classics National Road Race Championships (1912) Milan–San Remo (1919) Giro della Romagna (1913, 1925) Giro del Piemonte (1922)

Angelo Gremo (3 December 1887 – 4 September 1940) was an Italian cyclist.

== Palmares ==
1911
1st Coppa Val di Taro
1912
1st Italy National Road Race Championships
2nd Overall Giro d'Italia
1913
1st Giro della Romagna
1st Grand Prix de Turin
1914
1st Stage 1 Giro d'Italia
2nd Gran Piemonte
5th Giro dell'Emilia
10th Il Lombardia
1915
3rd Milan–San Remo
1917
1st Milan-La Spezia
1st Giro dell'Emilia
3rd Milan–San Remo
7th Il Lombardia
1919
1st Milan–San Remo
2nd National Road Race Championships
3rd Gran Piemonte
6th Overall Giro d'Italia
9th Giro dell'Emilia
1920
2nd Overall Giro d'Italia

1st Stage 8

9th Gran Piemonte
1921
1st Giro di Campania
1st Giro della Provincia Milano (with Gaetano Belloni)

1st Stage 1 (with Gaetano Belloni)

4th Gran Piemonte
5th Overall Giro d'Italia
1922
1st Giro del Piemonte
6th Il Lombardia
1923
3rd Gran Piemonte
8th Milan–San Remo
10th Overall Giro d'Italia
1924
3rd Milano–Torino
4th Gran Piemonte
8th Giro dell'Emilia
1925
1st Giro della Romagna
1926
8th Overall Giro d'Italia
9th Overall Volta a Catalunya

=== Grand Tour general classification results timeline ===
Grand Tour general classification results timeline
Grand Tour	1913	1914	1915	1916	1917	1918	1919	1920	1921	1922	1923	1924	1925	1926
Vuelta a España	Did not Exist													
Giro d'Italia	—	—	No Race				6	2	5	—	10	—	—	8
Tour de France	DNF	DNF	No Race				—	DNF	—	DNF	—	—	26	—
