= Ugo Agostoni =

Italian cyclist (1893–1941)

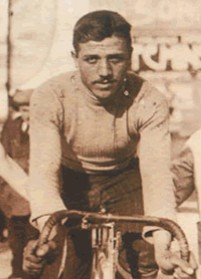
- Agostoni in the 1920s

Personal information
- Full name: Ugo Agostoni
- Nickname: Poncia
- Born: 27 July 1893 Lissone, Italy
- Died: 26 September 1941 (aged 48) Desio, Italy

Cycling career
- Sport: Cycling
- Discipline: Road
- Role: Rider

Major wins
- Grand Tours Giro d'Italia 1 individual stage (1920) One-day races and Classics Milan–San Remo (1914) Giro dell'Emilia (1912) Other National Hour Record (1913)

Ugo Agostoni (27 July 1893 – 26 September 1941) was an Italian professional road bicycle racer. Agostoni was professional from 1911 to 1924 during which time he won the Giro dell'Emilia, and a stage in the 1920 Giro d'Italia. Agostoni's greatest win was in Milan–San Remo in 1914.

Agostoni died during a surgery in the hospital in Desio. From 1946 onwards, a race has been organized in his honor called the Coppa Ugo Agostoni which has been won by several great cycling champions such as Felice Gimondi, Franco Bitossi, Eddy Merckx, Roger De Vlaeminck, Francesco Moser, Jan Ullrich and Gianni Bugno.

== Major results ==
1911
2nd National Road Race Championships
3rd Rome-Naples-Rome
3rd Coppa Savona
1912
1st Giro dell'Emilia
5th Giro di Lombardia
1914
1st Milan–San Remo
2nd Rome-Naples-Rome
9th Giro di Lombardia
1918
3rd Milan–San Remo
1919
3rd National Road Race Championships
4th Giro di Lombardia
1920
1st stage 8 Giro d'Italia
8th Milan–San Remo
9th Giro di Lombardia
1921
5th Milan–San Remo
1922
3rd Giro dell'Emilia
7th Milan–San Remo
