= Nello Ciaccheri =

Italian cyclist

Personal information
- Born: 8 September 1893 Bagno a Ripoli, Italy
- Died: 26 February 1971 (aged 77) Florence, Italy

Cycling career
- Sport: Cycling

Nello Ciaccheri (8 September 1893 – 26 February 1971) was an Italian cyclist. He competed in two events at the 1924 Summer Olympics.
