= Giro della Romagna =

Italian cycling race (1910–2011)

Race details
- Date: Early September
- Region: Romagna, Italy
- English name: Tour of Romagna
- Local name: Giro della Romagna (in Italian)
- Discipline: Road
- Competition: UCI Europe Tour
- Type: One-day
- Organiser: Società Ciclista Francesco Barraca
- Web site: www.ciclisticabaracca.it/giro.htm

History
- First edition: 1910
- Editions: 88 (as of 2025)
- First winner: Jean-Baptiste Dortignacq (FRA)
- Most wins: Fausto Coppi (ITA) (3 wins)
- Most recent: Christian Scaroni (ITA)

The Giro della Romagna is a semi classic European bicycle race held in the Italian region of Romagna. After 2005, the race was organised as a 1.1 event on the UCI Europe Tour. The race was discontinued in 2011, and in 2013, it merged with the Memorial Marco Pantani, which also takes place in Romagna.

The race returned in 2024, again on the UCI Europe Tour.

== Winners ==
| Year | Country | Rider | Team |
|---|---|---|---|
| 1910 | France | Jean-Baptiste Dortignacq | |
| 1911 | Italy | Giovanni Micheletto | |
| 1912 | Italy | Dario Beni | |
| 1913 | Italy | Angelo Gremo | |
| 1914 | Italy | Giovanni Cervi | |
| 1915– 1920 | No race | | |
| 1921 | Italy | Giovanni Roncon | |
| 1922 | Italy | Costante Girardengo | |
| 1923 | Italy | Giovanni Brunero | |
| 1924 | Italy | Luigi Magnotti | |
| 1925 | Italy | Angelo Gremo | |
| 1926 | Italy | Costante Girardengo | |
| 1927 | Italy | Allegro Grandi | |
| 1928 | Italy | Antonio Negrini | |
| 1929 | Italy | Alfredo Binda | |
| 1930 | Italy | Armando Zucchini | |
| 1931 | Italy | Ettore Meini | |
| 1932 | No race | | |
| 1933 | No race | | |
| 1934 | Italy | Aldo Canazza | |
| 1935 | Italy | Learco Guerra | |
| 1937 | Italy | Osvaldo Bailo | |
| 1938 | Italy | Pierino Favalli | |
| 1939– 1942 | No race | | |
| 1943 | Italy | Mario Fazio | |
| 1944– 1945 | No race | | |
| 1946 | Italy | Fausto Coppi | |
| 1947 | Italy | Fausto Coppi | |
| 1948 | Italy | Vito Ortelli | |
| 1949 | Italy | Fausto Coppi | |
| 1950 | Italy | Livio Isotti | |
| 1951 | Italy | Fiorenzo Magni | |
| 1952 | Italy | Luciano Maggini | |
| 1953 | Italy | Giancarlo Astrua | |
| 1954 | Italy | Giuseppe Minardi | |
| 1955 | Italy | Fiorenzo Magni | |
| 1956 | Italy | Pierino Baffi | |
| 1957 | Italy | Ercole Baldini | |
| 1958 | Italy | Carlo Zorzoli | |
| 1959 | Italy | Silvano Ciampi | |
| 1960 | Italy | Giorgio Tinazzi | |
| 1961 | Italy | Adriano Zamboni | |
| 1962 | Italy | Diego Ronchini | |
| 1963 | Italy | Bruno Mealli | |
| 1964 | Italy | Adriano Durante | |
| 1965 | Italy | Dino Zandegù | |
| 1966 | Italy | Gianni Motta | |
| 1967 | Italy | Bruno Mealli | |
| 1968 | Italy | Felice Gimondi | |
| 1969 | Italy | Dino Zandegù | |
| 1970 | Italy | Davide Boifava | |
| 1971 | Italy | Franco Bitossi | |
| 1972 | Italy | Pietro Guerra | |
| 1973 | Italy | Wladimiro Panizza | |
| 1974 | Italy | Franco Bitossi | |
| 1975 | No race | | |
| 1976 | Italy | Gianbattista Baronchelli | |
| 1977 | Italy | Roberto Ceruti | |
| 1978 | Italy | Valerio Lualdi | |
| 1979 | Italy | Gianbattista Baronchelli | |
| 1980 | Italy | Pierino Gavazzi | |
| 1981 | Italy | Giuseppe Saronni | |
| 1982 | Italy | Moreno Argentin | |
| 1983 | Belgium | Fons De Wolf | |
| 1984 | Italy | Pierino Gavazzi | |
| 1985 | Italy | Claudio Corti | |
| 1986 | Poland | Lech Piasecki | |
| 1987 | Italy | Ezio Moroni | |
| 1988 | Switzerland | Stephan Joho | |
| 1989 | Italy | Maximilian Sciandri | |
| 1990 | Italy | Maximilian Sciandri | |
| 1991 | Italy | Franco Ballerini | |
| 1992 | Switzerland | Beat Zberg | |
| 1993 | Switzerland | Pascal Richard | |
| 1994 | Italy | Roberto Petito | |
| 1995 | Italy | Davide Cassani | |
| 1996 | Italy | Andrea Ferrigato | |
| 1997 | Italy | Francesco Casagrande | |
| 1998 | Italy | Michele Bartoli | |
| 1999 | Italy | Roberto Conti | |
| 2000 | Russia | Dimitri Konyshev | |
| 2001 | Italy | Davide Rebellin | |
| 2002 | Italy | Gianluca Bortolami | |
| 2003 | Italy | Fabio Sacchi | |
| 2004 | Italy | Gianluca Bortolami | |
| 2005 | Italy | Danilo Napolitano | |
| 2006 | Italy | Santo Anzà | |
| 2007 | Italy | Eddy Serri | |
| 2008 | Italy | Enrico Gasparotto | |
| 2009 | Brazil | Murilo Fischer | Liquigas |
| 2010 | Germany | Patrik Sinkewitz | ISD–NERI |
| 2011 | Italy | Oscar Gatto | Farnese Vini–Neri Sottoli |
| 2012– 2023 | No race | | |
| 2024 | Portugal | António Morgado | UAE Team Emirates |
| 2025 | Italy | Christian Scaroni | XDS Astana Team |
