= Alfredo Sivocci =

Italian cyclist

Personal information
- Born: 4 January 1891 Milan, Italy
- Died: 10 July 1980 (aged 89) Milan, Italy

Cycling career
- Sport: Cycling
- Role: Rider

Alfredo Sivocci (4 January 1891 – 10 July 1980) was an Italian racing cyclist. He won stage 11 of the 1911 Giro d'Italia.
