= List of teams and cyclists in the 1910 Giro d'Italia =

The 1910 Giro d'Italia was the second edition of the Giro d'Italia, one of cycling's Grand Tours. The field consisted of 101 riders, and 20 riders finished the race.

== By rider ==
Legend
No.	Starting number worn by the rider during the Giro

No.	Name	Nationality
1	Battista Danesi	Italy
2	Andrea Massironi	Italy
3	Carlo Vertua	Italy
4	Carlo Galetti	Italy
5	Luigi Azzini	Italy
6	Giovanni Cocchi	Italy
7	Giovanni Rossignoli	Italy
8	Pietro Mari	Italy
9	Ernesto Azzini	Italy
10	Emilio Ghironi	Italy
11	Luigi Ganna	Italy
13	Clemente Canepari	Italy
14	Giovanni Marchese	Italy
15	Eberardo Pavesi	Italy
17	Attilio Zavatti	Italy
18	Giuseppe Brambilla	Italy
19	Mario Bruschera	Italy
20	Giovanni Cuniolo	Italy
21	Henri Lignon	France
22	Dario Beni	Italy
25	Constant Ménager	France
26	Maurice Brocco	France
27	Jean-Baptiste Dortignacq	France
28	Lucien Petit-Breton	France
29	Cesare Zanzottera	Italy
31	Alfredo Sivocci	Italy
32	Enrico Sala	Italy
33	Giuseppe Contesini	Italy
34	Pierino Albini	Italy
35	Domenico Cittera	Italy
36	Alberto Maverna	Italy
37	Cesare Turconi	Italy
38	Cesare Osnaghi	Italy
39	Luigi Rota	Italy
40	Sante Goi	Italy
42	Giovanni Micheletto	Italy
43	Alberto Sonetti	Italy
44	Giuseppe Ghezzi	Italy
45	Luigi San Marco	Italy
46	Gaetano Garavaglia	Italy
47	Luigi Chiodi	Italy
48	Luigi Zanella	Italy
49	Mario Pesce	Italy
50	Vincenzo Borgarello	Italy
51	Pierino Fiore	Italy
52	Ottorino Celli	Italy
53	Mario Della Valle	Italy
54	Roberto Rognoni	Italy
55	Mario Gajoni	Italy
56	Giuseppe Zuffardi	Italy
57	Pierino Terraneo	Italy
58	Arnoldo Galoppini	Italy
59	Karl Ditterbrandt	Germany
60	Arno Ritter	Germany
61	Giuseppe Lissoni	Italy
62	Enrico Raimondo	Italy
63	Gianbattista Durante	Italy
64	Augusto Rho	Italy
65	Antonio Bedano	Italy
66	Mariano Fraticelli	Italy
68	Mario Secchi	Italy
69	Pietro Aymo	Italy
70	Amelio Mainardi	Italy
71	Lauro Bordin	Italy
72	Piero Lampaggi	Italy
73	Pietro Gallia	Italy
74	Osvaldo Rolfo	Italy
75	Carlo Giorgetti	Italy
76	Camillo Centemeri	Italy
77	Fedele Dradi	Italy
79	Maurizio Chiabotto	Italy
80	Ezio Corlaita	Italy
81	Francesco Belia	Italy
82	Alfredo Beretta	Italy
83	Goffredo Tezza	Italy
84	Pierino Vighetti	Italy
85	Ildebrando Gamberini	Italy
86	Arrigo Nasi	Italy
87	Guido Dossi	Italy
88	Antonio Rotondi	Italy
89	Emilio Roscio	Italy
90	Luigi Grossi	Italy
91	Umberto Turconi	Italy
92	Valentino Maganza	Italy
93	Ettore Gandolfo	Italy
94	Giuseppe Baruffaldi	Italy
95	Annibale Magni	Italy
96	Giuseppe Santhià	Italy
97	Riccardo Traselli	Italy
98	Giovanni Scarpetta	Italy
99	Giuseppe Silvani	Italy
100	Alberto Petrino	Italy
101	Amleto Belloni	Italy
102	Luigi Martano	Italy
103	Amedeo Dusio	Italy
104	Umberto Baldini	Italy
105	Giuseppe Galbai	Italy
106	Giuseppe Perna	Italy
107	Domenico Manuzzi	Italy
111	Giuseppe Dilda	Italy
112	Andrea Provinciali	Italy
115	Lorenzo Mariano	Italy
116	Cesare Cislaghi	Italy
118	Amedeo Buzzi	Italy
