= List of teams and cyclists in the 1911 Giro d'Italia =

The 1911 Giro d'Italia was the third edition of the Giro d'Italia, one of cycling's Grand Tours. The field consisted of 86 riders, and 24 riders finished the race.

Legend
No.	Starting number worn by the rider during the Giro
Pos.	Position in the general classification
DNF	Denotes a rider who did not finish

No.	Name	Nationality
1	Luigi Cardani	Argentina
2	Albert Maubert	Argentina
3	Henri Lignon	France
4	Carlo Galetti	Italy
5	Eberardo Pavesi	Italy
6	Mario Bruschera	Italy
7	Giovanni Rossignoli	Italy
8	Giuseppe Dilda	Italy
9	Carlo Oriani	Italy
10	Dario Beni	Italy
11	Lauro Bordin	Italy
12	Alfredo Sivocci	Italy
13	Enrico Sala	Italy
14	Galeazzo Bolzoni	Italy
15	Cino Fattori	Italy
16	Luigi Ganna	Italy
17	Pierino Albini	Italy
18	Giuseppe Brambilla	Italy
19	Alfredo Tibiletti	Italy
20	Ugo Agostoni	Italy
21	Luigi Chiodi	Italy
22	Amedeo Dusio	Italy
23	Giuseppe Galbai	Italy
24	Emilio Ghironi	Italy
25	Giovanni Cocchi	Italy
26	Giuseppe Jacchino	Italy
28	Ezio Corlaita	Italy
30	Andrea Massironi	Italy
31	Lucien Petit-Breton	France
32	Emilio Petiva	Italy
33	Pietro Aymo	Italy
34	Giuseppe Santhià	Italy
35	Luigi Bailo	Italy
36	Michele Robotti	Italy
37	Carlo Vertua	Italy
38	Cesare Osnaghi	Italy
40	Sante Goi	Italy
41	Alberto Maverna	Italy
42	Ottavio Pratesi	Italy
43	Mario Pesce	Italy
44	Carlo Durando	Italy
45	Giuseppe Contesini	Italy
48	Giuseppe Perna	Italy
49	Ernesto Azzini	Italy
50	Luigi Azzini	Italy
51	Vincenzo Borgarello	Italy
52	Domenico Cittera	Italy
53	Clemente Canepari	Italy
54	Cesare Zanzottera	Italy
56	Omer Beaugendre	France
59	Felice Gallazzi	Italy
61	Piero Avali	Italy
62	Angelo Bartocetti	Italy
63	Augusto Rho	Italy
64	Mario Secchi	Italy
66	Ottorino Celli	Italy
67	Gino Brizzi	Italy
68	Luigi Fiaschi	Italy
70	Umberto Zoffoli	Italy
71	Michelangelo Bosio	Italy
72	Giovanni Cervi	Italy
73	Enrico Verde	Italy
74	Luigi Tassinari	Italy
75	Ildebrando Gamberini	Italy
76	Mario Gajoni	Italy
77	Fedele Dradi	Italy
78	Giovanni Blanchet	Italy
79	Vandre Ferrari	Italy
80	Giulio Modesti	Italy
82	Antonio Rotondi	Italy
83	Umberto Mongherda	Italy
84	Antonio De Michiel	Italy
85	Carlo Mairani	Italy
87	Emilio Roscio	Italy
88	Maurice Brocco	France
89	Attilio Zavatti	Italy
90	Giovanni Scarpetta	Italy
91	Giovanni Marchese	Italy
92	Mario Della Valle	Italy
93	Pierino Vighetti	Italy
94	Giuseppe Massagli	Italy
95	Apollinare Foglio	Italy
96	Apostoli Rabajoli	Italy
97	Giuseppe Dallou	Italy
99	Enrico Nanni	Italy
100	Giovanni Gerbi	Italy
