= List of teams and cyclists in the 1909 Giro d'Italia =

The 1909 Giro d'Italia was the inaugural edition of the Giro d'Italia, one of cycling's Grand Tours. The field consisted of 115 riders, and 49 riders finished the race.

== By rider ==
Legend
| No. | Starting number worn by the rider during the Giro |
| Pos. | Position in the general classification |
| DNF | Denotes a rider who did not finish |

| No. | Name | Nationality | Ref |
|---|---|---|---|
| 1 | Felice Peli | Italy | |
| 3 | Alberto Sonetti | Italy | |
| 5 | Gino Sacchi | Italy | |
| 6 | Ernesto Ferrari | Italy | |
| 7 | Giuseppe Brambilla | Italy | |
| 9 | Giovanni Gerbi | Italy | |
| 10 | Andrea Provinciali | Italy | |
| 11 | Sante Goi | Italy | |
| 12 | Giovanni Cuniolo | Italy | |
| 13 | Pietro Molina | Italy | |
| 14 | Luigi Chiodi | Italy | |
| 15 | Carlo Mairani | Italy | |
| 16 | Andrea Massironi | Italy | |
| 17 | Ernesto Azzini | Italy | |
| 19 | Luigi Ganna | Italy | |
| 20 | Giovanni Micheletto | Italy | |
| 21 | Annibale Magni | Italy | |
| 25 | Mario Bruschera | Italy | |
| 26 | Eberardo Pavesi | Italy | |
| 27 | Eugenio Carati | Italy | |
| 28 | Carlo Galetti | Italy | |
| 29 | Battista Danesi | Italy | |
| 30 | Domenico Milano | Italy | |
| 31 | Clemente Canepari | Italy | |
| 32 | Guido Rabaioli | Italy | |
| 33 | Giuseppe Ghezzi | Italy | |
| 34 | Giovanni Rossignoli | Italy | |
| 36 | Ernesto Bresciani | Italy | |
| 37 | Raffaele Coradini | Italy | |
| 39 | Mario Fortuna | Italy | |
| 40 | Piero Lampaggi | Italy | |
| 41 | Vincenzo Granata | Italy | |
| 42 | Dario Beni | Italy | |
| 43 | Ottorino Celli | Italy | |
| 47 | Gino Carini | Italy | |
| 48 | Mario Pesce | Italy | |
| 49 | Alvaro Bacchilega | Italy | |
| 51 | Mario Allais | Italy | |
| 53 | Luigi Gatti | Italy | |
| 54 | A. Giovanni | Italy | |
| 55 | Giovanni Marchese | Italy | |
| 56 | Guido Di Marco | Italy | |
| 57 | Giovanni Stevani | Italy | |
| 58 | Guglielmo Lodesani | Italy | |
| 59 | Canzio Brasey | Italy | |
| 60 | Attilio Zavatti | Italy | |
| 61 | Domenico Manuzzi | Italy | |
| 62 | Giovanni Cervi | Italy | |
| 63 | Louis Trousselier | France | |
| 64 | André Pottier | France | |
| 65 | Maurice Decaup | France | |
| 67 | Giovanni Cocchi | Italy | |
| 68 | Carlo Oriani | Italy | |
| 69 | Mario Gajoni | Italy | |
| 71 | Lucien Petit-Breton | France | |
| 72 | Vandre Ferrari | Italy | |
| 73 | Luigi Como | Italy | |
| 74 | Umberto Ceccarelli | Italy | |
| 75 | Aristide Cavalotti | Italy | |
| 76 | Faccio Bolzoni | Italy | |
| 77 | Umberto Jacomino | Italy | |
| 78 | Luigi Martano | Italy | |
| 79 | Agostino Sanna | Italy | |
| 80 | Raffaele Castellaccio | Italy | |
| 81 | Ezio Corlaita | Italy | |
| 82 | Angelo Magagnoli | Italy | |
| 85 | Renzo Vacchi | Italy | |
| 86 | Ottorino Sabbaini | Italy | |
| 87 | Angelo De Rossi | Italy | |
| 88 | Antonio Rotondi | Italy | |
| 89 | Guido Magrini | Italy | |
| 90 | Alessandro Pazienti | Italy | |
| 91 | Mario Secchi | Italy | |
| 92 | Alfredo Jacobini | Italy | |
| 93 | Giovanni Casale | Italy | |
| 94 | Giuseppe Pavesi | Italy | |
| 95 | Senofonte Castellini | Italy | |
| 96 | Enrico Nanni | Italy | |
| 97 | Attilio Bertarelli | Italy | |
| 98 | Enrico Sala | Italy | |
| 99 | Giovanni-Battista Carena | Italy | |
| 100 | Giovanni Colombo | Italy | |
| 101 | Cesare Osnaghi | Italy | |
| 102 | Pasquale Lissoni | Italy | |
| 103 | Mario Lonati | Italy | |
| 104 | Ferruccio Pozzi | Italy | |
| 105 | Giuseppe Celerino | Italy | |
| 106 | Alessandro Sacco | Italy | |
| 108 | Giuseppe Anzani | Italy | |
| 109 | Giuseppe Galbai | Italy | |
| 110 | Egidio Gambato | Italy | |
| 111 | Augusto Rho | Italy | |
| 113 | Giulio Modesti | Italy | |
| 114 | Giuseppe Perna | Italy | |
| 115 | Giovanni Ciotti | Italy | |
| 116 | Giuseppe Jacchino | Italy | |
| 117 | Edoardo Brenta | Italy | |
| 118 | Ugo Faravelli | Italy | |
| 119 | Alessandro Novaresi | Italy | |
| 120 | Azeglio Tomarelli | Italy | |
| 121 | Leone Canepari | Italy | |
| 122 | Guglielmo Malatesta | Italy | |
| 124 | Arnolfo Galoppini | Italy | |
| 125 | Antonio Baldi | Italy | |
| 126 | Antonio Scolaro | Italy | |
| 128 | Romeo Zuliani | Italy | |
| 129 | Giuseppe Calvi | Italy | |
| 130 | Carlo Fumagali | Italy | |
| 131 | Luigi Spiritelli | Italy | |
| 132 | Alberto Petrino | Italy | |
| 133 | Romolo Buni | Italy | |
| 134 | Alfredo Banfi | Italy | |
| 136 | Camillo Carcano | Italy | |
| 140 | Ambrogio Erba | Italy | |
| 141 | Luigi Ferri | Italy | |
| 142 | Luigi Rota | Italy | |
| 143 | Luigi Azzini | Italy | |
| 144 | Emilio Roscio | Italy | |
| 145 | Angelo Moretti | Italy | |
| 152 | Domenico Ferrari | Italy | |
| 153 | Ildebrando Gamberini | Italy | |
| 154 | Davide Della Valle | Italy | |
| 155 | Vincenzo Borgarello | Italy | |
| 157 | Ernesto Vitali | Italy | |
| 158 | Henry Heller | Italy | |
| 163 | Pietro Guzetti | Italy | |
| 166 | Amleto Belloni | Italy | |
