= 1909 Giro d'Italia, Stage 1 to Stage 4 =

Cycling race stages

The 1909 Giro d'Italia was the inaugural edition of the Giro d'Italia, one of cycling's Grand Tours. The Giro began in Milan on 13 May, and Stage 4 occurred on 20 May with a stage to Rome. The race finished in Milan on 30 May.

== Stage 1 ==
13 May 1909 — Milan to Bologna, 397 km (247 mi)

Stage 1 result

Rank	Rider	Time
1	Dario Beni (ITA)	14h 06' 15"
2	Mario Pesce (ITA)	s.t.
3	Carlo Galetti (ITA)	s.t.
4	Luigi Ganna (ITA)	
5	Louis Trousselier (FRA)	
6	Eberardo Pavesi (ITA)	
7	Attilio Zavatti (ITA)	
8	Ernesto Azzini (ITA)	
9	Giovanni Marchese (ITA)	
10	Vincenzo Borgarello (ITA)	

General classification after Stage 1

Rank	Rider	Points
1	Dario Beni (ITA)	1
2	Mario Pesce (ITA)	2
3	Carlo Galetti (ITA)	3
4	Luigi Ganna (ITA)	4
5	Louis Trousselier (FRA)	5
6	Eberardo Pavesi (ITA)	6
7	Attilio Zavatti (ITA)	9
8	Ernesto Azzini (ITA)	9
9	Giovanni Marchese (ITA)	9
10	Vincenzo Borgarello (ITA)	9

== Stage 2 ==
16 May 1909 — Bologna to Chieti, 375.8 km (233.5 mi)

Stage 2 result

Rank	Rider	Time
1	Giovanni Cuniolo (ITA)	14h 12' 14"
2	Luigi Ganna (ITA)	s.t.
3	Louis Trousselier (FRA)	s.t.
4	Ernesto Azzini (ITA)	
5	Carlo Oriani (ITA)	
6	Mario Bruschera (ITA)	
7	Vincenzo Borgarello (ITA)	
8	Carlo Galetti (ITA)	
9	Giovanni Gerbi (ITA)	
10	André Pottier (FRA)	

General classification after Stage 2

Rank	Rider	Points
1	Luigi Ganna (ITA)	6
2	Louis Trousselier (FRA)	8
3	Carlo Galetti (ITA)	11
4	Ernesto Azzini (ITA)	12
5	Vincenzo Borgarello (ITA)	13
6	Giovanni Rossignoli (ITA)	20
7	Dario Beni (ITA)	22
8	Carlo Oriani (ITA)	23
9	Alberto Petrino (ITA)	27
10	Clemente Canepari (ITA)	27

== Stage 3 ==
18 May 1909 — Chieti to Naples, 242.8 km (150.9 mi)

Stage 3 result

Rank	Rider	Time
1	Giovanni Rossignoli (ITA)	9h 28' 04"
2	Luigi Ganna (ITA)	s.t.
3	Clemente Canepari (ITA)	s.t.
4	Ottorino Celli (ITA)	
5	Giovanni Gerbi (ITA)	
6	Louis Trousselier (FRA)	
7	Giovanni Micheletto (ITA)	
8	Carlo Oriani (ITA)	
9	Enrico Sala (ITA)	
10	Piero Lampaggi (ITA)	

General classification after Stage 3

Rank	Rider	Points
1	Carlo Galetti (ITA)	13
2	Louis Trousselier (FRA)	14
3	Luigi Ganna (ITA)	17
4	Giovanni Rossignoli (ITA)	21
5	Ernesto Azzini (ITA)	25
6	Clemente Canepari (ITA)	30
7	Carlo Oriani (ITA)	31
8	Enrico Sala (ITA)	46
9	André Pottier (FRA)	48
10	Dario Beni (ITA)	50

== Stage 4 ==
20 May 1909 — Naples to Rome, 228.1 km (141.7 mi)

Stage 4 result

Rank	Rider	Time
1	Luigi Ganna (ITA)	8h 31' 56"
2	Carlo Oriani (ITA)	s.t.
3	Giovanni Rossignoli (ITA)	+ 4' 54"
4	Clemente Canepari (ITA)	
5	Carlo Galetti (FRA)	
6	Vincenzo Borgarello (ITA)	
7	Mario Fortuna (ITA)	
8	Louis Trousselier (FRA)	
9	Dario Beni (ITA)	
10	Giovanni Gerbi (ITA)	

General classification after Stage 4

Rank	Rider	Points
1	Luigi Ganna (ITA)	17
2	Carlo Galetti (ITA)	18
3	Louis Trousselier (FRA)	22
4	Giovanni Rossignoli (ITA)	24
5	Carlo Oriani (ITA)	32
6	Clemente Canepari (ITA)	34
7	Ernesto Azzini (ITA)	37
8	Dario Beni (ITA)	58
9	Vincenzo Borgarello (ITA)	60
10	Enrico Sala (ITA)	61
