= List of teams and cyclists in the 1912 Giro d'Italia =

The 1912 Giro d'Italia was the fourth edition of Giro d'Italia, one of cycling's Grand Tours, and marked four years since the first race in 1909. The Giro featured 56 riders — all of Italian descent — on 14 cycling teams, starting in Milan on 19 May and finishing in Bergamo on 4 June.

The 1912 edition of the Giro d'Italia was unique in that the general classification was a point system that was based on teams rather than individuals as in years past. The organizers limited the entrance of the race to teams of four, which meant there were no independent riders like in previous editions. According to a La Stampa article, there were six professional teams, six incorraggiamento teams, and one military team. The professional teams were Bianchi, Peugeot, Senior, Gerbi, Atala, and Legnano. The incorraggiamento teams were Goerike, Soriani, Soc. Ramella, Favero, Bolgona, and Bergami, while the military team was Stucchi. Each team wore specific, unique colored jersey while racing each day.

== Teams ==
Legend
No.	Starting number worn by the rider during the Giro	Pos.	Position in the general classification
DNS	Denotes a rider who did not start, followed by the stage before which they withdrew	DNF	Denotes a rider who did not finish, followed by the stage in which they withdrew

Bianchi
No.	Rider	Pos.
1	Dario Beni (ITA)	
2	Mario Bruschera (ITA)	DNF-6
3	Pietro Aymo (ITA)	DNS-6
4	Giuseppe Santhià (ITA)	DNF-6

Peugeot
No.	Rider	Pos.
5	Carlo Durando (ITA)	2
6	Angelo Gremo (ITA)	2
7	Ugo Agostoni (ITA)	2
8	Domenico Allasia (ITA)	2

Senior
No.	Rider	Pos.
9	Gino Brizzi (ITA)	DNF-6
10	Giuseppe Contesini (ITA)	
11	Eligio Bianco (ITA)	DNF-6
12	Cesare Osnaghi (ITA)	DNS-6

Gerbi
No.	Rider	Pos.
13	Giovanni Gerbi (ITA)	3
14	Giovanni Rossignoli (ITA)	3
15	Pierino Albini (ITA)	3
16	Lauro Bordin (ITA)	3

Atala-Dunlop
No.	Rider	Pos.
17	Luigi Ganna (ITA)	DNF-5
18	Carlo Galetti (ITA)	1
19	Giovanni Micheletto (ITA)	1
20	Eberardo Pavesi (ITA)	1

Legnano
No.	Rider	Pos.
21	Ernesto Azzini (ITA)	6
22	Vincenzo Borgarello (ITA)	6
23	Luigi Azzini (ITA)	DNS-1
24	Natale Bosco (ITA)	–

Goericke
No.	Rider	Pos.
25	Domenico Dilda (ITA)	4
26	Enrico Sala (ITA)	4
27	Giovanni Cocchi (ITA)	4
28	Carlo Vertua (ITA)	4

Soriani
No.	Rider	Pos.
29	Andrea Massironi (ITA)	DNF-2
30	Camillo Bertarelli (ITA)	DNF-2
31	Augusto Rho (ITA)	DNS-3
32	Rinaldo Spinelli (ITA)	DNS-3

Ranella
No.	Rider	Pos.
33	Senofonte Castellini (ITA)	DNS-3
34	Giovanni Roncon (ITA)	DNS-3
35	Antonio Della Fusine (ITA)	DNS-3
36	Emilio Pagani (ITA)	DNS-3

Favero-Dunlop
No.	Rider	Pos.
37	Guglielmo Zanella (ITA)	
38	Gino Zanchetta (ITA)	
39	Luigi Molon (ITA)	
40	Evaristo Lello (ITA)	

L'Italiana
No.	Rider	Pos.
41	Ildebrando Gamberini (ITA)	DNS-6
42	Alfonso Calzolari (ITA)	DNS-4
43	Cesare Zini (ITA)	DNS-3
44	Aldo Benassi (ITA)	DNS-6

Bergami
No.	Rider	Pos.
45	Azeglio Tomarelli (ITA)	
46	Giuseppe Perna (ITA)	–
47	Antonio Rotondi (ITA)	–
48	Umberto Zoffolo (ITA)	DNS-1

Globo
No.	Rider	Pos.
49	Sante Goi (ITA)	5
50	Cesare Goi (ITA)	5
51	Mario Santagostino (ITA)	5
52	Alberto Maverna (ITA)	5

Stucchi
No.	Rider	Pos.
53	Michele Robotti (ITA)	
54	Emanuele Garda (ITA)	
55	Carlo Oriani (ITA)	DNS-2
56	Pietro Fasoli (ITA)	

== Teams ==
Legend
No.	Starting number worn by the rider during the Giro
Pos.	Position in the general classification
Comp.	Denotes whether the rider completed the race
DNS	Denotes a rider who did not start, followed by the stage before which they withdrew
DNF	Denotes a rider who did not finish, followed by the stage in which they withdrew
Prize Money	This refers to the amount of lire given to the team based on their general classification finish and does not include the lire given for stage placings

Pos.	Team				Prize Money
Pos.	Team name	No.	Riders	Comp.	Prize Money
1	Atala-Dunlop	17	Luigi Ganna (ITA)	No, DNF-5	4000 lire
1	Atala-Dunlop	18	Carlo Galetti (ITA)	Yes	4000 lire
1	Atala-Dunlop	19	Giovanni Micheletto (ITA)	Yes	4000 lire
1	Atala-Dunlop	20	Eberardo Pavesi (ITA)	Yes	4000 lire
2	Peugeot	5	Carlo Durando (ITA)	Yes	2000 lire
2	Peugeot	6	Angelo Gremo (ITA)	Yes	2000 lire
2	Peugeot	7	Ugo Agostoni (ITA)	Yes	2000 lire
2	Peugeot	8	Domenico Allasia (ITA)	Yes	2000 lire
3	Gerbi	13	Giovanni Gerbi (ITA)	Yes	1000 lire
3	Gerbi	14	Giovanni Rossignoli (ITA)	Yes	1000 lire
3	Gerbi	15	Pierino Albini (ITA)	Yes	1000 lire
3	Gerbi	16	Lauro Bordin (ITA)	Yes	1000 lire
4	Goericke	25	Domenico Dilda (ITA)	Yes	600 lire
4	Goericke	26	Enrico Sala (ITA)	Yes	600 lire
4	Goericke	27	Giovanni Cocchi (ITA)	Yes	600 lire
4	Goericke	28	Carlo Vertua (ITA)	Yes	600 lire
5	Globo	49	Sante Goi (ITA)	Yes	400 lire
5	Globo	50	Cesare Goi (ITA)	Yes	400 lire
5	Globo	51	Mario Santagostino (ITA)	Yes	400 lire
5	Globo	52	Alberto Maverna (ITA)	Yes	400 lire
—	Legnano	21	Ernesto Azzini (ITA)	Yes	—
—	Legnano	22	Vincenzo Borgarello (ITA)	Yes	—
—	Legnano	23	Luigi Azzini (ITA)	DNS-1	—
—	Legnano	24	Natale Bosco (ITA)	No	—
—	Bianchi	1	Dario Beni (ITA)	No	—
—	Bianchi	2	Mario Bruschera (ITA)	DNF-6	—
—	Bianchi	3	Pietro Aymo (ITA)	DNS-6	—
—	Bianchi	4	Giuseppe Santhià (ITA)	DNF-6	—
—	Senior	9	Gino Brizzi (ITA)	DNF-6	—
—	Senior	10	Giuseppe Contesini (ITA)	No	—
—	Senior	11	Eligio Bianco (ITA)	DNF-6	—
—	Senior	12	Cesare Osnaghi (ITA)	DNS-6	—
—	Soriani	29	Andrea Massironi (ITA)	DNF-2	—
—	Soriani	30	Camillo Bertarelli (ITA)	DNF-2	—
—	Soriani	31	Augusto Rho (ITA)	DNS-3	—
—	Soriani	32	Rinaldo Spinelli (ITA)	DNS-3	—
—	Ranella	33	Senofonte Castellini (ITA)	DNS-3	—
—	Ranella	34	Giovanni Roncon (ITA)	DNS-3	—
—	Ranella	35	Antonio Dalle Fusine (ITA)	DNS-3	—
—	Ranella	36	Emilio Pagani (ITA)	DNS-3	—
—	Favero-Dunlop	37	Guglielmo Zanella (ITA)	No	—
—	Favero-Dunlop	38	Gino Zanchetta (ITA)	No	—
—	Favero-Dunlop	39	Luigi Molon (ITA)	No	—
—	Favero-Dunlop	40	Evaristo Lello (ITA)	No	—
—	L'Italiana	41	Ildebrando Gamberini (ITA)	DNS-6	—
—	L'Italiana	42	Alfonso Calzolari (ITA)	DNS-4	—
—	L'Italiana	43	Cesare Zini (ITA)	DNS-3	—
—	L'Italiana	44	Aldo Benassi (ITA)	DNS-6	—
—	Bergami	45	Azeglio Tomarelli (ITA)	No	—
—	Bergami	46	Giuseppe Perna (ITA)	Yes	—
—	Bergami	47	Antonio Rotondi (ITA)	Yes	—
—	Bergami	48	Umberto Zoffolo (ITA)	DNS-1	—
—	Stucchi	53	Michele Robotti (ITA)	Yes	—
—	Stucchi	54	Emanuele Garda (ITA)	Yes	—
—	Stucchi	55	Carlo Oriani (ITA)	DNS-2	—
—	Stucchi	56	Pietro Fasoli (ITA)	Yes	—
