= List of teams and cyclists in the 1914 Giro d'Italia =

The 1914 Giro d'Italia was the sixth edition of the Giro d'Italia, one of cycling's Grand Tours. The field consisted of 81 riders, and eight riders finished the race.

== By rider ==
Legend
| No. | Starting number worn by the rider during the Giro |
| Pos. | Position in the general classification |
| DNF | Denotes a rider who did not finish |

| No. | Name | Nationality | Team | Ref |
|---|---|---|---|---|
| 1 | Giuseppe Contesini | Italy | Atala–Dunlop | |
| 2 | Paul Duboc | France | Atala–Dunlop | |
| 3 | Freddie Grubb | Great Britain | Atala–Dunlop | |
| 4 | Lucien Petit-Breton | France | Atala–Dunlop | |
| 5 | Giovanni Rossignoli | Italy | Atala–Dunlop | |
| 7 | Gino Brizzi | Italy | Atala–Dunlop | |
| 8 | Pierino Albini | Italy | Globo | |
| 10 | Gaetano Garavaglia | Italy | Globo | |
| 11 | Mario Spinelli | Italy | Globo | |
| 12 | Ezio Corlaita | Italy | Ganna | |
| 13 | Pietro Fasoli | Italy | Ganna | |
| 14 | Luigi Ganna | Italy | Ganna | |
| 15 | Angelo Gremo | Italy | Ganna | |
| 16 | Giuseppe Santhià | Italy | Ganna | |
| 17 | Dario Beni | Italy | Stucchi–Dunlop | |
| 18 | Alfonso Calzolari | Italy | Stucchi–Dunlop | |
| 19 | Clemente Canepari | Italy | Stucchi–Dunlop | |
| 20 | Emilio Petiva | Italy | Stucchi–Dunlop | |
| 21 | Carlo Durando | Italy | Maino–Dunlop | |
| 22 | Costante Girardengo | Italy | Maino–Dunlop | |
| 23 | Giosue Lombardi | Italy | Maino–Dunlop | |
| 24 | Luigi Lucotti | Italy | Maino–Dunlop | |
| 25 | Leopoldo Toricelli | Italy | Maino–Dunlop | |
| 26 | Ugo Agostoni | Italy | Bianchi–Dei | |
| 27 | Giuseppe Azzini | Italy | Bianchi–Dei | |
| 28 | Lauro Bordin | Italy | Bianchi–Dei | |
| 29 | Giovanni Cervi | Italy | Bianchi–Dei | |
| 30 | Carlo Galetti | Italy | Bianchi–Dei | |
| 31 | Carlo Oriani | Italy | Bianchi–Dei | |
| 32 | Eberardo Pavesi | Italy | Bianchi–Dei | |
| 33 | Alfredo Sivocci | Italy | Bianchi–Dei | |
| 34 | Giovanni Gerbi | Italy | Gerbi | |
| 35 | Ottavio Pratesi | Italy | Alcyon–Soly | |
| 37 | Ettore Arato | Italy | Lone rider | |
| 38 | Michele Robotti | Italy | Lone rider | |
| 39 | Luigi Molon | Italy | Lone rider | |
| 40 | Giovanni Barsizia | Italy | Lone rider | |
| 41 | Giovanni Colella | Italy | Lone rider | |
| 43 | Sante Goi | Italy | Lone rider | |
| 44 | Mario Marangoni | Italy | Lone rider | |
| 45 | Domenico Allasia | Italy | Lone rider | |
| 46 | Giovanni Areso | Italy | Lone rider | |
| 47 | Giovanni Fassi | Italy | Lone rider | |
| 49 | Giuseppe Pifferi | Italy | Lone rider | |
| 50 | Eligio Bianco | Italy | Lone rider | |
| 51 | Romildo Verde | Italy | Lone rider | |
| 52 | Marcello Sussio | Italy | Lone rider | |
| 53 | Camillo Bertarelli | Italy | Lone rider | |
| 55 | Giuseppe Ghezzi | Italy | Lone rider | |
| 56 | Arturo Ferrario | Italy | Lone rider | |
| 57 | Nerino Savini | Italy | Lone rider | |
| 58 | Georges Goffin | Belgium | Lone rider | |
| 59 | Giovanni Roncon | Italy | Lone rider | |
| 60 | Gaetano Bacci | Italy | Lone rider | |
| 61 | Angelo Erba | Italy | Lone rider | |
| 63 | Enrico Sala | Italy | Lone rider | |
| 64 | Luigi Annoni | Italy | Lone rider | |
| 65 | Telesforo Benaglia | Italy | Lone rider | |
| 66 | Lorenzo Redaelli | Italy | Lone rider | |
| 67 | Giovanni Casetta | Italy | Lone rider | |
| 68 | Giovanni Marchese | Italy | Lone rider | |
| 69 | Maggiore Albani | Italy | Lone rider | |
| 70 | Emilio Chironi | Italy | Lone rider | |
| 71 | Domenico Cittera | Italy | Lone rider | |
| 73 | Giuseppe Dilda | Italy | Lone rider | |
| 74 | Guido Vercellino | Italy | Lone rider | |
| 77 | Mario Della Valle | Italy | Aspiring rider | |
| 81 | Giuseppe Bonfanti | Italy | Aspiring rider | |
| 82 | Giuseppe Prada | Italy | Aspiring rider | |
| 84 | Alessandro Dorati | Italy | Aspiring rider | |
| 86 | Umberto Ripamonti | Italy | Aspiring rider | |
| 87 | Floriano Maggiori | Italy | Aspiring rider | |
| 88 | Ciro Ricci | Italy | Aspiring rider | |
| 89 | Riccardo Palea | Italy | Aspiring rider | |
| 90 | Mario Santagostini | Italy | Aspiring rider | |
| 91 | Angelo Pavesi | Italy | Aspiring rider | |
| 93 | Luigi Santamaria | Italy | Aspiring rider | |
| 94 | Luigi Magri | Italy | Aspiring rider | |
| 95 | Gaudenzo Garavaglia | Italy | Aspiring rider | |
| 98 | Luigi Menozzi | Italy | Aspiring rider | |
| 99 | G. Cabrino | Italy | Aspiring rider | |
