= 1911 Giro d'Italia =

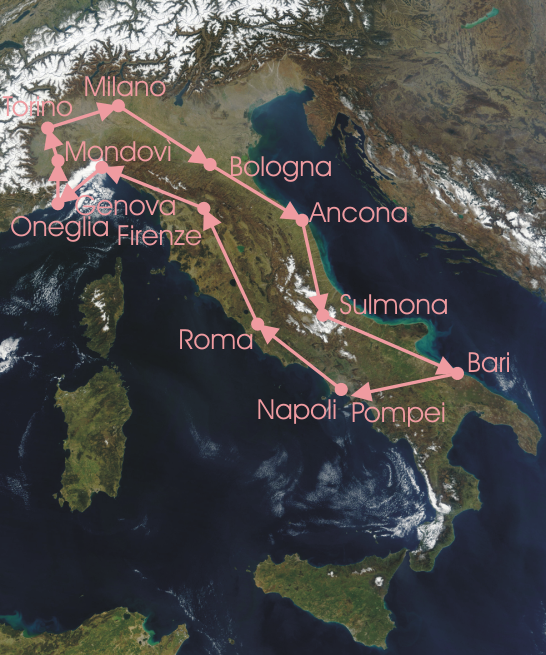
- Overview of the stages: route clockwise from Rome, up to Turin, down to Bari, and up to Rome

Race details
- Dates: 15 May – 6 June 1911
- Stages: 12
- Distance: 3,530.3 km (2,194 mi)
- Winning time: 132h 24' 00"

Results
	Winner	Carlo Galetti (ITA)	(Bianchi)
	Second	Giovanni Rossignoli (ITA)	(Bianchi)
	Third	Giovanni Gerbi (ITA)	
	Team	(Italy) Bianchi	

The 1911 Giro d'Italia was the third edition of the Giro d'Italia, a Grand Tour set up and sponsored by the newspaper La Gazzetta dello Sport. The race began on 18 May in Rome with a stage that stretched 394.1 km (245 mi) to Florence. It was composed of twelve stages that covered a total distance of 3,530.3 km (2,194 mi). The race came to a close back in Rome on 6 June after a 266.9 km (166 mi) stage. The race was won by the Italian rider Carlo Galetti of the Bianchi team. Second and third respectively were the Italian riders Giovanni Rossignoli and Giovanni Gerbi.

Returning champion Carlo Galetti won the race's opening stage into Florence and was the first to lead the race. He lost the lead to Giovanni Rossignoli after Galetti finished poorly on the race's second stage. Rossignoli held the lead for four days after Galetti took back the lead after the sixth stage. Frenchman Lucien Petit-Breton became the first non-Italian to lead the Giro d'Italia after the race's ninth stage. Petit-Breton lost the lead the next day to Galetti, who then held it all the way to the race's conclusion in Rome.

== Changes from the 1910 Giro d'Italia ==
In both 1909 and 1910 Milan had served as both the start and finish of the Giro d'Italia. The organizers chose to honor the 50th anniversary of the unification of Italy by holding the start and finish of the Giro in the Italian capital of Rome.

The organizers chose to expand the Giro d'Italia from ten to twelve stages after its great success. The race also saw an increase of close to 500 kilometers in length. The organizers also included the first climb above 2000 meters in the race, the Sestriere. This was also the first edition of the Giro to go deep down into the southern part of Italy, specifically the Bari.

== Participants ==
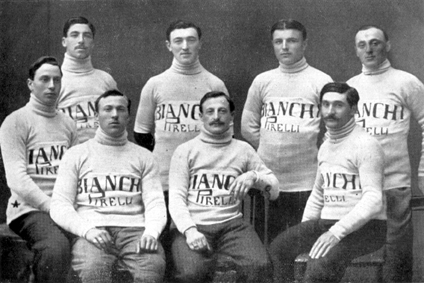
The Bianchi team from the 1911 Giro

Of the 86 riders that began the Giro d'Italia on 15 May, 24 of them made it to the finish in Rome on 6 June. Riders were allowed to ride on their own or as a member of a team. There were five teams that competed in the race: Atala-Dunlop, Bianchi-Pirelli, Fiat-Pirelli, Legnano-Dunlop, and Senior-Polack.

The peloton was composed of primarily Italians. The field featured two former Giro d'Italia champions in the 1909 winner Luigi Ganna and returning champion Carlo Galetti. Other notable Italian riders included Giovanni Rossignoli, Eberardo Pavesi, and Giovanni Gerbi. Two-time Tour de France winner Lucien Petit-Breton also competed in the race.

== Race overview ==
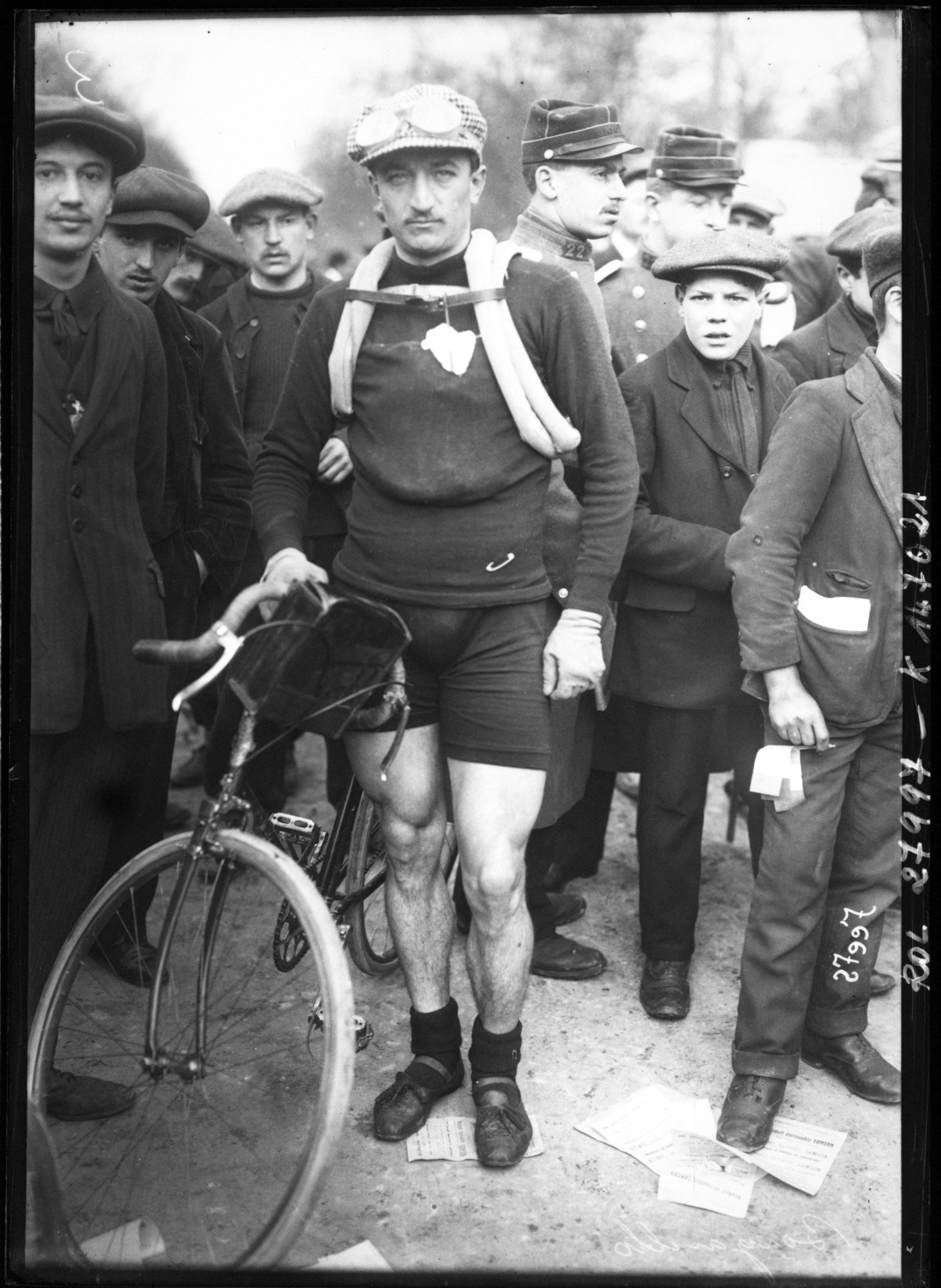
Italian Vincenzo Borgarello won the second stage of the race.

The first stage began on 15 May and stretched from Rome to Florence. The racing that day was marred by heavy rain, which led to ten withdrawals. Carlo Galetti won the stage ahead of Giovanni Rossignoli and Dario Beni. The next leg was also dogged by rain and very poor conditions on the road and saw the climbing of the Colle de Bacco. Giovanni Gerbi was the first rider to summit the Colle de Bacco. The climb wore Gerbi out and he was caught and passed by three riders and ultimately finished fourth on the stage. Vincenzo Borgarello was the first rider to cross the finish line in Genoa and won the stage, where a large crowd waited for the riders to finish. Rossignoli took the race lead after finishing two positions in front of Galetti. The race's third day of racing was the first to have clear weather. Race leader Rossignoli bested the likes of Giovanni Gerbi and Carlo Durando to win the stage and consolidate his lead in the general classification. The next stage was hotly contested, with the peloton staying together for the whole stage as Carlo Galetti took the stage win.

The race's fifth stage is considered to be the first real mountain stage in Giro d'Italia history. The stage contained the climb of the Sestriere which rises over 2,000 meters. As the race entered the Val Chisone leading up the Sestriere, the peloton ran into muddy roads, which forced many to walk their bikes. Frenchman Lucien Petit-Breton led the riders up the slopes before cracking near the snowy summit. He was passed first by Ezio Corlaita, who was the first to summit the Sestriere, and then by many other riders. Petit-Breton caught up with the leading riders on the long descent and rode into the finish in Turin with Corlaita, Rossignoli, and Galetti. Petit-Breton edged out Galetti for the stage win as Galetti tied Rossignoli for the overall lead.

The riders started the sixth stage in Turin with a large number of people in attendance for the sendoff. Giuseppe Santhià took the stage as the riders rolled over the packed finish line in Milan. Dario Beni soloed to victory in the seventh leg, finishing over a minute ahead of the second-place finisher Santhià. The next stage was won by Lauro Bordin as Galetti extended his overall lead by a single point over Rossignoli. Ezio Corlaita won the Giro's ninth stage, while Lucien Petit-Breton took the race lead and doing so, became the first non-Italian to lead the Giro d'Italia. In the following stage, the leading breakaway contained six riders – race leader Petit-Breton and five Bianchi riders – and rode into the finish in Bari together. Carlo Galetti took the stage win and the race lead, while Petit-Breton finished in sixth place on the day and was pushed down to second overall.

The race's penultimate day of racing was scheduled to go from Bari to Naples. During the stage, Lucien Petit-Breton crashed and was forced to abandon the race. The route had the riders go through rough roads that were heavy with dust and occasional passed over streams, thus flooding the roads. The riders were also chase by enraged buffalo. All of those factors caused the riders to end the stage a few kilometers short of Naples, in Pompeii with Alfredo Sivocci winning the day. The last stage ended back in Rome, where the race began. Ezio Corlaita took his second stage win as 24 riders that began the Giro finished the day. Bianchi's Carlo Galetti became the first rider to win two editions of the Giro d'Italia.

== Final standings ==
=== Stage results ===
Stage results
Stage	Date	Course	Distance	Type (Note: In 1911, there was no distinction in the rules between plain stages and mountain stages; the icons shown here indicate that the first, second, third, fourth, fifth, tenth, and eleventh stages included major mountains.)	Winner	Race Leader
1	15 May	Rome to Florence	394.1 km (245 mi)	Stage with mountain(s)	Carlo Galetti (ITA)	Carlo Galetti (ITA)
2	17 May	Florence to Genoa	261.5 km (162 mi)	Stage with mountain(s)	Vincenzo Borgarello (ITA)	Giovanni Rossignoli (ITA)
3	19 May	Genoa to Oneglia	274.9 km (171 mi)	Stage with mountain(s)	Giovanni Rossignoli (ITA)	Giovanni Rossignoli (ITA)
4	21 May	Oneglia to Mondovì	190.3 km (118 mi)	Stage with mountain(s)	Carlo Galetti (ITA)	Giovanni Rossignoli (ITA)
5	23 May	Mondovì to Turin	302 km (188 mi)	Stage with mountain(s)	Lucien Petit-Breton (FRA)	Giovanni Rossignoli (ITA)
6	25 May	Turin to Milan	236.2 km (147 mi)	Plain stage	Giuseppe Santhià (ITA)	Carlo Galetti (ITA)
7	27 May	Milan to Bologna	394 km (245 mi)	Plain stage	Dario Beni (ITA)	Carlo Galetti (ITA)
8	29 May	Bologna to Ancona	283.4 km (176 mi)	Plain stage	Lauro Bordin (ITA)	Carlo Galetti (ITA)
9	31 May	Ancona to Sulmona	218.7 km (136 mi)	Plain stage	Ezio Corlaita (ITA)	Lucien Petit-Breton (FRA)
10	2 June	Sulmona to Bari	363.1 km (226 mi)	Stage with mountain(s)	Carlo Galetti (ITA)	Carlo Galetti (ITA)
11	4 June	Bari to Pompei (Note: The stage was scheduled to end in Naples but due to a variety of factors, the riders chose to stop riding in the city of Pompeii.)	345.2 km (214 mi)	Stage with mountain(s)	Alfredo Sivocci (ITA)	Carlo Galetti (ITA)
12	6 June	Naples to Rome	266.9 km (166 mi)	Plain stage	Ezio Corlaita (ITA)	Carlo Galetti (ITA)
	Total		3,530.3 km (2,194 mi)			

=== General classification ===
There were 24 cyclists who had completed all twelve stages. For these cyclists, the points they received from each of their stage placing's were added up for the general classification. The cyclist with the fewest accumulated points was the winner. Giovanni Gerbi won the prize for best ranked isolati rider in the general classification.

Final general classification (1–10)
Rank	Name	Team	Points
1	Carlo Galetti (ITA)	Bianchi	50
2	Giovanni Rossignoli (ITA)	Bianchi	58
3	Giovanni Gerbi (ITA)	—	84
4	Giuseppe Santhià (ITA)	Fiat	86
5	Ezio Corlaita (ITA)	—	89
6	Dario Beni (ITA)	Atala-Continental	93
7	Alfredo Sivocci (ITA)	Senior-Polack	95
8	Eberardo Pavesi (ITA)	Bianchi	96
9	Giuseppe Contesini (ITA)	—	111
10	Gino Brizzi (ITA)	—	112

Final general classification (11–24)
Rank	Name	Team	Points
11	Carlo Oriani (ITA)	Bianchi	113
12	Enrico Sala (ITA)	Senior-Polack	125
13	Giuseppe Dilda (ITA)	—	129
14	Cesare Osnaghi (ITA)	—	131
15	Ildebrando Gamberini (ITA)	—	133
16	Galeazzo Bolzoni (ITA)	—	134
17	Lauro Bordin (ITA)	Senior-Polack	135
18	Attilio Zavatti (ITA)	—	141
19	Carlo Vertua (ITA)	—	155
20	Ottavio Pratesi (ITA)	—	160
21	Andrea Massironi (ITA)	—	165
22	Mario Gaioni (ITA)	—	169
23	Apollinare Foglio (ITA)	—	173
24	Antonio Rotondi (ITA)	—	178
