= Roma–Napoli–Roma =

Road cycle race

Race details
- Date: September
- Region: Southern Italy
- English name: Rome–Naples–Rome
- Local name: Roma–Napoli–Roma (in Italian)
- Nickname(s): Corsa del XX Settembre (in Italian); Race of 20 September (in English)
- Discipline: Road
- Type: One-day cycling race, stage race

History
- First edition: 1902
- Editions: 38
- Final edition: 1961
- First winner: Ferdinand Grammel (GER)
- Most wins: Costante Girardengo (ITA) (5 wins)
- Final winner: Jean Graczyk (FRA)

Roma–Napoli–Roma (English: Rome–Naples–Rome) was a road cycle race held from 1902 until 1961. The race had different names during its history: Corsa del XX Settembre (Race of 20 September) from 1919 to 1927, as it was raced in September, and Gran Premio Ciclomotoristico during its final twelve editions from 1950 to 1961. The post-World War II editions of the event were held in late April or early May.

Ferdinand "Fernandino" Grammel, a German living in Rome, was the winner of the inaugural edition. Costante Girardengo holds the record with five wins in the 1920s.

== Winners ==
Edition	Winner	Second	Third
1902	(Germany) Ferdinand Grammel	(Italy) Alfredo Jacorossi	(Italy) Enzo Spadoni
1903	(Italy) Enzo Spadoni	(Italy) Angelo De Rossi	(Italy) Labindo Mancinelli
1904	(Italy) Achille Galadini	(Italy) Pierino Albini	(Italy) Fernandino Grammel
1905	(Italy) Eberardo Pavesi	(Italy) Giulio Modesti	(Italy) Alfredo Jacobini
1906	(Italy) Carlo Galetti	(Italy) Amadeo Baiocco	(Italy) Fernandino Grammel
1907	(Italy) Giovanni Gerbi	(Italy) Alfredo Jacobini	(Italy) Umberto Zoffoli
1908	(Italy) Giovanni Gerbi	(Italy) Luigi Chiodi	(Italy) Luigi Ganna
1909	(Italy) Giovanni Gerbi	(Italy) Eberardo Pavesi	(Italy) Pietro Aymo
1910	(Italy) Mario Bruschera	(Italy) Luigi Ganna	(Italy) Carlo Galetti
1911	(Italy) Dario Beni	(Italy) Carlo Galetti	(Italy) Ugo Agostoni
1912	(Italy) Dario Beni	(Italy) Giuseppe Santhia	(Italy) Gino Brizzi
1913	(Italy) Costante Girardengo	(Italy) Giosuè Lombardi	(Italy) Luigi Ganna and Carlo Galetti
1914	(Italy) Dario Beni	(Italy) Ugo Agostoni	(Italy) Giuseppe Pifferi
1919	(Italy) Alfredo Sivocci	(Italy) Giuseppe Azzini	(Italy) Giosuè Lombardi
1920	(Italy) Angielo Marchi	(Italy) Lauro Bordin	(Italy) Nicolò di Biase
1921	(Italy) Costante Girardengo	(Italy) Gaetano Belloni	(Italy) Federico Gay
1922	(Italy) Costante Girardengo	(Italy) Federico Gay	(Italy) Emilio Petiva
1923	(Italy) Costante Girardengo	(Italy) Giuseppe Azzini	(Italy) Federico Gay
1924	(Italy) Romolo Lazzaretti	(Italy) Michele Gordini	(Italy) Costante Girardengo
1925	(Italy) Costante Girardengo	(Italy) Gaetano Belloni	(Italy) Adriano Zanaga
1926	(Italy) Alfredo Binda	(Italy) Leonida Frascarelli	(Italy) Giuseppe Pancera
1927	(Italy) Giuseppe Pancera	(Italy) Pietro Fossati	(Italy) Michele Gordini
1928	(Italy) Antonio Negrini	(Italy) Luigi Giacobbe	(Italy) Pietro Fossati
1929	(Italy) Gaetano Belloni	(Italy) Domenico Piemontesi	(Italy) Piero Bestetti
1930	(Italy) Michele Mara	(Italy) Raffaele di Paco	(Italy) Domenico Piemontesi
1934	(Italy) Learco Guerra	(Italy) Umberto Guarducci	(Italy) Isidoro Piubellini
1950	(France) Jean Robic	(Italy) Fausto Coppi	(France) Louison Bobet
1951	(Switzerland) Ferdinand Kübler	(Italy) Guido de Santi	(Italy) Nedo Logli
1952	(Italy) Fiorenzo Magni	(Belgium) Stan Ockers	(France) Jean Robic
1953	(Italy) Fiorenzo Magni	(Belgium) Stan Ockers	(Italy) Bruno Monti
1954	(Italy) Bruno Monti	(Italy) Fausto Coppi	(Belgium) Rik Van Steenbergen
1955	(Italy) Bruno Monti	(Italy) Nino Defilippis	(Italy) Fausto Coppi
1956	(Belgium) Stan Ockers	(Italy) Bruno Monti	(Luxembourg) Charly Gaul
1957	(Netherlands) Wouter Wagtmans	(Spain) Miguel Poblet	(Italy) Aldo Moser
1958	(Belgium) Joseph Hoevenaers	(Spain) Miguel Poblet	(Italy) Giuseppe Fallarini
1959	(France) Louis Bobet	(Italy) Gastone Nencini	(Italy) Armando Pellegrini
1960	(France) Louis Bobet	(Netherlands) Wout Wagtmans	(Italy) Carlo Brugnami
1961	(France) Jean Graczyk	(Italy) Graziano Battistini	(Belgium) Hilaire Couvreur
