= 1905 Giro di Lombardia =

Race details
- Dates: 12 November 1905
- Stages: 1
- Distance: 230.5 km (143.2 mi)
- Winning time: 9h 13' 52"

Results
	Winner	Giovanni Gerbi (ITA)	(Maino)
	Second	Giovanni Rossignoli (ITA)	(Bianchi)
	Third	Luigi Ganna (ITA)	(Rudge-Whitworth)

The 1905 Giro di Lombardia was the 1st edition of the Giro di Lombardia, a classic one-day cycle race organised by La Gazzetta dello Sport in Italy. The single day event was held on 12 November 1905. It was won by Italian Giovanni Gerbi of the Maino team.

== The race ==
The race started with 55 riders. Giovanni Gerbi made his winning move at a railroad crossing. He jumped up the crossing and back onto the course and rode ahead, while a few riders behind crashed. Gerbi stretched his advantage to forty minutes. Of the riders that began the race, 12 finished the course.

== Results ==
Final results (1–10)
Rank	Cyclist	Team	Time
1	Giovanni Gerbi (ITA)	Maino	11h 04' 15"
2	Giovanni Rossingoli (ITA)	Bianchi	+ 40' 11"
3	Luigi Ganna (ITA)	Rudge-Whitworth	+ 40' 46"
4	Carlo Galetti (ITA)	—	s.t.
5	Carlo Mairani (ITA)	—	+ 1h 32' 08"
6	Alfredo Jacarossi (ITA)	Rudge-Whitworth	+ 1h 33' 08"
7	Battista Danesi (ITA)	—	s.t.
8	Andrea Massironi (ITA)	Rudge-Whitworth	+ 1h 42' 08"
9	Luigi Mori (ITA)	—	+ 1h 43' 08"
10	Gualtiero Farina (ITA)	Bianchi	+ 1h 46' 08"

Final results (11–12)
Rank	Cyclist	Time	
11	Alfredo Tibiletti (ITA)	—	+ 2h 40' 08"
12	Mario Cazzaniga (ITA)	Tre Fucilli	+ ?
