= Antonio Baldi =

Antonio Baldi may refer to:

- Antonio Baldi (painter) (c. 1692 – 1768), Italian painter
- Antonio Baldi (singer) (fl 1714–35), Italian opera singer and castrato
- Antonio Baldi, a bronze medalist at the 1996 South American Cross Country Championships
- Antonio Baldi, a cyclist at the 1909 Giro d'Italia
- Antonio Baldi, a character in the film Le Marginal
- Antonio Baldi, a character in the television series Carabinieri

== See also ==
- Antonio Pompa-Baldi (born 1974), Italian-American pianist
- Charles Carmine Antonio Baldi (1862–1930), Italian-American merchant, banker, newspaper publisher, entrepreneur and philanthropist
- Charles Carmine Antonio Baldi Jr. (1890-1962), American politician
