= Giro di Sicilia =

Italian bicycle race

Race details
- Date: April
- Region: Sicily
- English name: Tour of Sicily
- Discipline: Road
- Competition: UCI Europe Tour
- Type: Stage race
- Organiser: RCS Sport
- Web site: ilgirodisicilia.it

History
- First edition: 1907
- Editions: 27 (as of 2023)
- First winner: Carlo Galetti (ITA)
- Most recent: Alexey Lutsenko (KAZ)

another "Giro di Sicilia" was held for automobiles, in some years prior to 1951 known as Targa Florio

Giro di Sicilia (English: Tour of Sicily) is a men's multi-stage bicycle race held on Sicily, Italy. The race was first held in 1907 and was won by Carlo Galetti. The race disappeared from the calendar after the 1977 edition won by Giuseppe Saronni, until it was revived by RCS Sports in 2019. The first edition of the revived race was won by American rider Brandon McNulty. It is part of the UCI Europe Tour, classified as a 2.1 event.

The 2024 edition was cancelled as RCS Sport, in collaboration with the Abruzzo Region, will organize the Giro d'Abruzzo instead.

== Winners ==
Year	Winner	Second	Third
1907	(Italy) Carlo Galetti	(Italy) Luigi Ganna	(Italy) Umberto Zoffoli
1908	(Italy) Carlo Galetti	(Italy) Pierino Albini	(Italy) Ernesto Azzini
1926	(Italy) Domenico Caratozzolo	(Italy) Francisco Gambino	(Italy) Gianbattista Gilli
1929	(Italy) Nicola Mammina	(Italy) Leonida Frascarelli	(Italy) Albino Binda
1932	(Italy) Nicola Mammina	(Italy) Attilio Pavesi	(Italy) Antonio Nicolosi
1936	(Italy) Francesco Patti	(Italy) Ernesto Zuppa	(Italy) Alfredo Mazzocchetti
1939	(Italy) Remo Cerasa	(Italy) Francesco Patti	(Italy) Giovanni Corrieri
1940–1947	Not held (WW II)		
1948	(Italy) Francesco Patti	(Italy) Marcello Spadolini	(Italy) Italiano Lazzerini
1949	(Italy) Dino Rossi	(Italy) Sergio Pagliazi	(Italy) Angelo Fumagali
1950	(Italy) Donato Zampini	(Italy) Giacomo Zampieri	(Italy) Arigo Padovan
1951	(Italy) Primo Volpi	(Italy) Francesco Patti	(Italy) Ugo Fondelli
1952	Not held		
1953	(Italy) Elio Brasola	(Italy) Pietro Giudici	(Italy) Luigi Mastroianni
1954	(Italy) Ugo Massocco	(Italy) Livio Isotti	(Italy) Giovanni Roma
1955	(Italy) Gilberto Dall'Agata	(Italy) Franco Franchi	(Italy) Renzo Accordi
1956	(Italy) Piero Polo	(Italy) Luciano Ciancola	(Italy) Walter Serena
1957	(Italy) Alberto Emiliozzi	(Italy) Alfredo Sabbadin	(Italy) Giuseppe Cainero
1958	(Italy) Carlo Azzini	(Italy) Gianbattista Milesi	(Italy) Antonio Catalano
1958	(Italy) Diego Ronchini	(Italy) Noè Conti	(Italy) Mario Mori
1959	(Italy) Loris Guernieri	(Italy) Federico Galeaz	(Italy) Noé Conti
1960	(Italy) Giorgio Tinazzi	(Italy) Aurelio Cestari	(Italy) Idrio Bui
1961–1972	Not held		
1973	(Italy) Enrico Maggioni	(Italy) Michele Dancelli	(Italy) Enrico Paolini
1974	(Belgium) Roger De Vlaeminck	(Belgium) Patrick Sercu	(Italy) Marino Basso
1975–1976	Not held		
1977	(Italy) Giuseppe Saronni	(Italy) Pierino Gavazzi	(Italy) Carmelo Barone
1978–2018	Not held		
2019	(United States) Brandon McNulty	(France) Guillaume Martin	(Italy) Fausto Masnada
2020	Not held due to the COVID-19 pandemic		
2021	(Italy) Vincenzo Nibali	(Spain) Alejandro Valverde	(Italy) Alessandro Covi
2022	(Italy) Damiano Caruso	(Ecuador) Jefferson Alexander Cepeda	(South Africa) Louis Meintjes
2023	(Kazakhstan) Alexey Lutsenko	(South Africa) Louis Meintjes	(Italy) Vincenzo Albanese
