= Luigi Chiodi =

Italian cyclist (1887–1959)

Personal information
- Born: 18 June 1887 Turin, Italy
- Died: 17 February 1959 (aged 71) Druento, Italy

Cycling career
- Sport: Cycling
- Discipline: Road
- Role: Rider

Professional teams
- 1907: Bianchi
- 1908: Peugeot–Wolber
- 1909: Atala–Dunlop
- 1910: Peugeot–Wolber / Stucchi
- 1911: Atala–Dunlop
- 1912–1914: Individual

Luigi Chiodi (18 June 1887 – 17 February 1959) was an Italian professional road cyclist active from 1907 to 1914. He was an Italian pioneer of early competitive cycling participating at the international main races in his era.

== Biography ==
Born in Turin on 18 June 1887, Chiodi turned professional in 1907 and competed until 1914. Known as a generous and determined rider, he was considered a specialist in breakaways, having “attacks in his head before even in his legs” and possessed a strong, gladiatorial physique. He won in his debut year the 1907 Susa–Moncenisio, finished second in the Coppa Val d'Olona and third in the Coppa Savona. At the Italian National Road Championships he finished fifth just like in the Coppa del Re, and the Corsa Nazionale. He also finished seventh in both the Milano–Bologna–Firenze and the Giro delle Antiche Province.

In 1908, riding for Peugeot alongside his close friend Giovanni Gerbi, known as the "Diavolo Rosso", Chiodi produced what many considered his finest season. He took second place in both the 1908 Roma–Napoli–Roma and the 1908 Giro del Piemonte, fourth in the Giro dell'Emilia, and fifth in the Milano–Verona, Corsa Nazionale, and Coppa Rho. Chiodi participated in the first ever Giro d'Italia in 1909 Giro d'Italia, where he finished 11th overall, claiming four top-ten stage finishes. That same year, he was third in the Gran Premio Biella and fourth in the Coppa Savona. He also competed in two Tour de France editions and three Milan–San Remo races, with his best Sanremo result being 16th in 1909 Milan–San Remo.

In 1910, now with Peugeot and Stucchi, he won the Coppa San Giorgio, placed third in the Coppa Guicciardini, fourth in the Coppa Bastogi and Coppa Val di Ceno, and fifth in both the Genova–Nizza and the Giro di Romagna–Toscana. Although he continued racing until 1914, Chiodi, like Gerbi, experienced a rapid and irreversible decline after his peak years. His last notable result came in his final season with a ninth place in the Genova–Nizza. He died in Druento on 17 February 1959.

== Major results ==
1907
1st Susa–Mont Cenis
2nd Coppa Val d'Olona
5th Italian National Road Race Championships
6th Corza Nazionale
6th Giro del Piemonte

1908
2nd Giro del Piemonte
2nd Roma–Napoli–Roma

3rd stage 1

9th stage 5 1908 Tour de France
8th Corsa Vittorio Emanuele III e Regina Madre
5th Corza Nazionale

1909
11th Overall 1909 Giro d'Italia

7th stage 5
6th stage 6
5th stage 7
6th stage 8

1910
1st Coppa San Giorgio
4th Coppa Bastogi
7th Giro dell'Emilia
10th Giro della Romagna
5th Giro di Romagna-Toscana
1914
9th Genoa–Nice

=== Grand Tour general classification results ===
Stage races	1908	1909
Giro d'Italia	NH	11th
Tour de France	DNF	DNF

=== Classic cycle races results ===
Classic cycle races	1907	1908	1909	1910	1911	1912	1914
Milan–San Remo	—	DNF	16th	DNF	37th	44th	—
Giro del Piemonte	6th	2nd	NH	—	14th	—	21st
Giro della Romagna	NH	NH	NH	10th	15th	—	—
