= Ferdinand Grammel =

German cyclist (1878–1951)

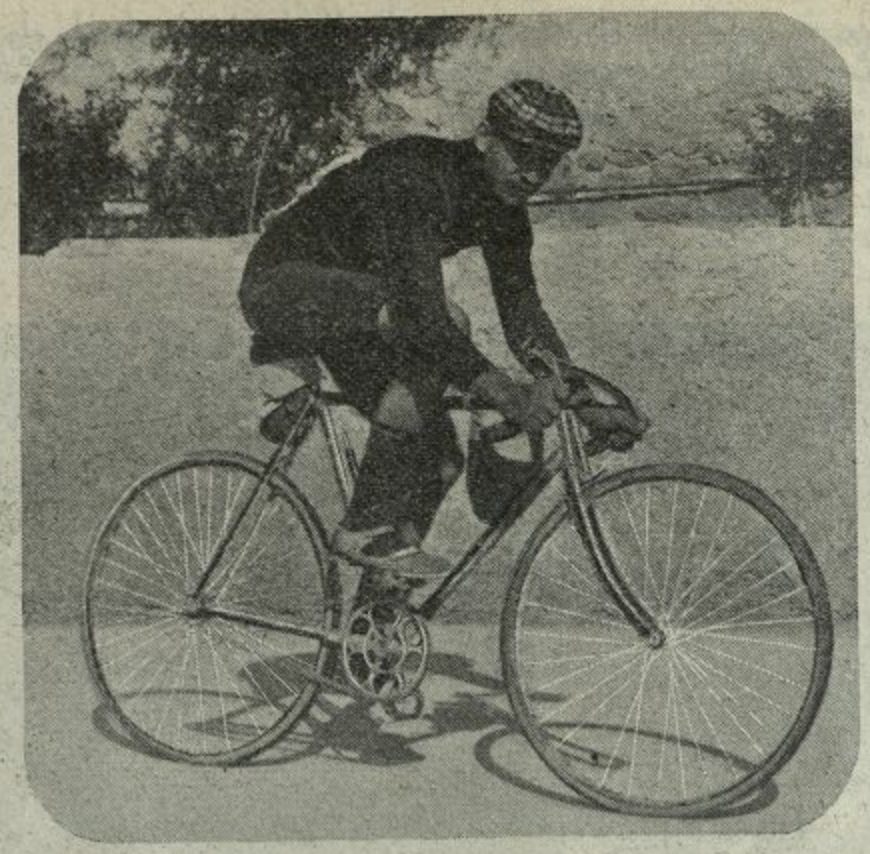

Personal information
- Full name: Ferdinand Grammel
- Nickname: Fernandino Grammel
- Born: 24 May 1878 Freudenstadt, German Empire
- Died: 23 June 1951 (aged 73) Rome, Italy

Cycling career
- Sport: Cycling
- Discipline: Road
- Role: Rider

Professional teams
- 1902 - 1903: Sporting Club di Roma
- 1904 - 1907: Società Velocipedistica Romana

Major wins
- 1902 Corsa del XX Settembre (Roma - Napoli - Roma)

Ferdinand Grammel (24 May 1878 – 23 June 1951) was a German road racing cyclist who lived most of his life in Rome. He specialized in the popular extreme long-distance races of the beginning of the 20th century. In 1902 he won the first Corsa del XX Settembre, a 460 km race between the cities of Rome and Naples organised to commemorate the Italian reunification.

He was born in Christophstal, a small hamlet near Freudenstadt, in Württemberg. At a young age he moved to Rome where he was active in the family business. He remained in Rome until his death.

== Major results ==
1902
1st Corsa del XX Settembre
1904
3rd Corsa del XX Settembre
1906
3rd Corsa del XX Settembre
6th Milano–Bologna–Roma
1907
4th Corsa del XX Settembre
