= 1910 Giro d'Italia =

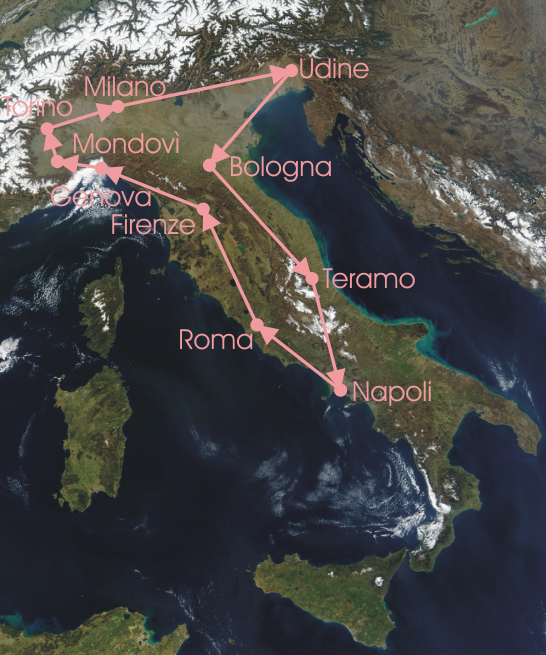
- Overview of the stages: route clockwise from Milan, down to Naples, then up to Milan

Race details
- Dates: 18 May – 5 June 1910
- Stages: 10
- Distance: 2,987.4 km (1,856.3 mi)
- Winning time: 114h 24' 00"

Results
	Winner	Carlo Galetti (ITA)	(Atala-Continental)
	Second	Eberardo Pavesi (ITA)	(Atala-Continental)
	Third	Luigi Ganna (ITA)	(Atala-Continental)
	Team	(Italy) Atala-Continental	

The 1910 Giro d'Italia was the second edition of the Giro d'Italia, a Grand Tour organized and sponsored by the newspaper La Gazzetta dello Sport. The race began on 18 May in Milan with a stage that stretched 388 km (241 mi) to Udine, finishing back in Milan on 5 June after a 277.5 km (172 mi) stage and a total distance covered of 2,987.4 km (1,856 mi). The race was won by the Italian rider Carlo Galetti of the Atala-Continental team, with fellow Italians Eberardo Pavesi and Luigi Ganna coming in second and third respectively.

Eberardo Pavesi was the first rider to lead the race after winning the first stage into Udine. After the second stage, Carlo Galetti took the lead of the race. Galetti then successfully defended the lead all the way to the race's finish in Milan. En route to his overall victory, Galetti won two stages. The Atala-Continental team finished as winners of the team classification.

== Changes from the 1909 Giro d'Italia ==
One major change was made to the calculation for the general classification before the start of the second Giro d'Italia. Originally a point was given to each rider for his placing on each stage, but the organizers chose to give the riders who placed 51st or higher in a stage 51 points and keep the point distribution system the same for the riders who placed 1st through 50th in a stage.

The organizers chose to increase the length of their race after the success from the first edition. The original race was eight stages long and the 1910 edition was increased by two stages, to ten. The overall length of the race was increased to close to 3,000 kilometers, which made the race close to 500 kilometers longer than the inaugural edition of the race.

== Participants ==
A total of 101 riders started the second Giro d'Italia out of the 118 that signed up to participate. Of the 101 riders that began the Giro d'Italia on 18 May, twenty of them made it to the finish in Milan on 5 June. Riders were allowed to ride on their own or as a member of a team. There were six teams that competed in the race: Atala-Continental, Atena-Dunlop, Bianchi-Dunlop, Legnano-Dunlop, Otav-Pirelli, and Stucchi-Pirelli.

The notable participants included the reigning champion of the Giro d'Italia, Luigi Ganna. The peloton also contained some of the most famous Italian cyclists at the time in Carlo Galetti, Ezio Corlaita, Giovanni Rossignoli, and Eberardo Pavesi. Two-time Tour de France champion Lucien Petit-Breton rode the Giro for the second straight year, along with his fellow countryman Jean-Baptiste Dortignacq who had been successful in the Tour. The Giro also saw its first German participants, neither of whom completed the race.

== Race overview ==
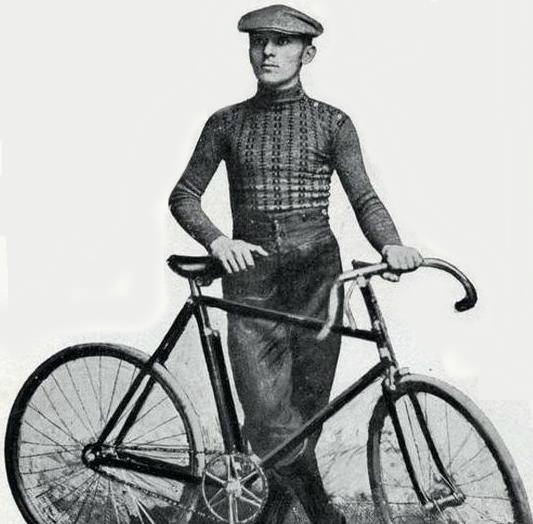
Eberardo Pavesi won two stages at the 1910 Giro d'Italia.

The first stage of the second Giro d'Italia began with a large send off in the start city of Milan. The finish in Udine was hotly contested as five riders came to the finish line in a pack. Ernesto Azzini managed to out-sprint the other four riders in the leading group to win the stage. The next stage saw the first non-Italian stage winner in the history of the Giro d'Italia, the Frenchman Jean-Baptiste Dortignacq. Dortignacq managed to breakaway from his fellow group member Carlo Galetti and then solo to the stage victory while five other riders chased close behind. Galetti's second-place finish on the stage was high enough for him to take the lead of the race. The French success enraged the Italian fans and led the competing riders to ban unite against the foreign riders. The third stage saw three major Italian riders, Luigi Ganna, Carlo Galetti, and Eberardo Pavesi, and attack early on in the stage. The three riders then rode together all the way to the finish in Teramo. Galetti went on to win the stage, with Ganna and Pavesi following in quick succession.

The Giro's fourth stage saw a tough stage with poor conditions for the riders, which ultimately led to the withdrawal of many riders including the likes of Lucien Petit-Breton - who was ranked third overall at the time. The peloton's pace was slower due to the w poor conditions, which caused the riders to arrive two hours later than expected in Naples. Pierino Albini beat out the Frenchman Maurice Brocco by 36 seconds for stage victory. Prior to the fifth stage's start, Frenchman Jean-Baptiste Dortignacq withdrew from the race after citing an illness. The police suspected foul play and looked into the situation, but their results are disputed through contradicting stories. Due to impassable roads, the start of the fifth stage was moved from Naples to Capua and decreased the distance of the stage from 224.1 km (139 mi) to 192.3 km (119 mi). Eberardo Pavesi won the fifth stage after leading for most of the race.

The peloton remained intact for roughly the first half of the sixth stage. Luigi Ganna and Carlo Galetti broke away from the pack and made it to the finish in Rome where Ganna then edged out Galetti for the stage victory. During the next stage, a group of six riders lead for the most part before Galetti and Ganna broke away again. The two riders made their way to the finish in Genoa, where a large crowd of spectators came to see the finish. Ganna went on to win his second consecutive stage, while Galetti extended his lead over the rest of the field. The race's eighth stage contained some harsh climbs, most notably the Giovi. The finish of the stage was hotly contested as Galetti, Ganna, and Eberardo Pavesi finished at the same time, with Galetti winning the stage in the end.

Eberardo Pavesi dominated the difficult ninth stage that contained the major climbs of the Nava, Tenda, and San Bartolomeo. Pavesi went on to win the stage by close to six minutes over the second-place finisher Luigi Ganna. The race's tenth and final stage was marred by rain. Race leader Carlo Galetti crashed into a hay wagon early on in the stage and sustained some heavy wounds, he would get back on his bike and finish the stage in fifth place. Despite the rain in Milan, many spectators still came to watch the riders arrive. Luigi Ganna was the first rider to cross the finish line in Milan and in doing so, he won his third stage of the 1910 Giro d'Italia. Carlo Galetti won the Giro d'Italia by a margin of eighteen points over Pavesi. Galetti and his team, Atala-Continental, won the team classification.

== Final standings ==
=== Stage results ===
Stage results
Stage	Date	Course	Distance	Type (Note: In 1910, there was no distinction in the rules between plain stages and mountain stages; the icons shown here indicate that the fourth, fifth, sixth, seventh, eighth, ninth, and tenth stages included major mountains.)	Winner	Race Leader
1	18 May	Milan to Udine	388 km (241 mi)	Plain stage	Ernesto Azzini (ITA)	Ernesto Azzini (ITA)
2	20 May	Udine to Bologna	322.4 km (200 mi)	Plain stage	Jean-Baptiste Dortignacq (FRA)	Carlo Galetti (ITA)
3	22 May	Bologna to Teramo	345.2 km (214 mi)	Plain stage	Carlo Galetti (ITA)	Carlo Galetti (ITA)
4	24 May	Teramo to Naples	319.5 km (199 mi)	Stage with mountain(s)	Pierino Albini (ITA)	Carlo Galetti (ITA)
5	26 May	Naples to Rome	192.3 km (119 mi)	Plain stage	Eberardo Pavesi (ITA)	Carlo Galetti (ITA)
6	28 May	Rome to Florence	327.5 km (203 mi)	Stage with mountain(s)	Luigi Ganna (ITA)	Carlo Galetti (ITA)
7	30 May	Florence to Genoa	263.5 km (164 mi)	Stage with mountain(s)	Luigi Ganna (ITA)	Carlo Galetti (ITA)
8	1 June	Genoa to Mondovì	218.1 km (136 mi)	Stage with mountain(s)	Carlo Galetti (ITA)	Carlo Galetti (ITA)
9	2 June	Mondovì to Turin	333.4 km (207 mi)	Stage with mountain(s)	Eberardo Pavesi (ITA)	Carlo Galetti (ITA)
10	5 June	Turin to Milan	277.5 km (172 mi)	Stage with mountain(s)	Luigi Ganna (ITA)	Carlo Galetti (ITA)
	Total		2,987.4 km (1,856 mi)			

=== General classification ===
There were 20 cyclists who had completed all ten stages. For these cyclists, the points they received from each of their stage placing's were added up for the general classification. The cyclist with the least accumulated points was the winner. Ezio Corlaita won the prize for best ranked isolati rider in the general classification.

Final general classification (1–10)
Rank	Name	Team	Points
1	Carlo Galetti (ITA)	Atala-Continental	28
2	Eberardo Pavesi (ITA)	Atala-Continental	46
3	Luigi Ganna (ITA)	Atala-Continental	51
4	Ezio Corlaita (ITA)	—	71
5	Emilio Chironi (ITA)	Otav-Pirelli	77
6	Battista Danesi (ITA)	Atala-Continental	87
7	Clemente Canepari (ITA)	Otav-Pirelli	102
8	Giovanni Marchese (ITA)	Otav-Pirelli	114
9	Ildebrando Gamberini (ITA)	—	120
10	Giuseppe Galbai (ITA)	—	132

Final general classification (11–20)
Rank	Name	Team	Points
11	Augusto Rho (ITA)	—	137
12	Antonio Rotondi (ITA)	—	139
13	Giuseppe Perna (ITA)	—	141
14	Cesare Osnaghi (ITA)	—	145
15	Amedeo Dusio (ITA)	—	149
16	Alberto Sonetti (ITA)	—	151
17	Mario Secchi (ITA)	—	156
17	Giovanni Scarpetta (ITA)	—	156
17	Luigi Rotta (ITA)	—	156
20	Umberto Turconi (ITA)	—	161
