= 1909 Milan–San Remo =

Race details
- Dates: 4 April 1909
- Stages: 1
- Distance: 286.7 km (178.1 mi)
- Winning time: 9h 32' 00"

Results
	Winner	Luigi Ganna (Italy)	(Atala-Dunlop)
	Second	Emile Georget (France)	(independent)
	Third	Giovanni Cuniolo (Italy)	(Rudge Whitworth-Pirelli)

The third running of the Milan–San Remo cycling classic was held on 4 April 1909. The race was won by Luigi Ganna, the first Italian to win Milan–San Remo. 104 riders started the race; 57 finished.

== Summary ==
The success of foreign riders in the two previous editions had made the race gain popularity. For the first time, more than a hundred starters signed up. 104 riders, of which 20 Belgians and French, were at the start in Milan just before six in the morning. It was a cold day and rain had made the unpaved pre-war roads very muddy.

Luigi Ganna had broken away on the Passo del Turchino, before half-race, and was subsequently joined and dropped by Emile Georget and Giovanni Cuniolo. In Savona, Georget took a wrong way – he said a clerk signalled him in the wrong direction – and was passed by Ganna who powered on solo to San Remo. At the finish, Ganna, a former bricklayer, was welcomed by an enthusiastic crowd and became the first Italian winner of Milan–San Remo. Georget finished second at 3 minutes, Cuniolo third at 18 minutes. For the first time, the speed average exceeded 30 km/h.

== Results ==
	Rider	Team	Time
1	(Italy) Luigi Ganna	Atala-Dunlop	9h 32' 00"
2	(France) Emile Georget	–	+ 3' 00"
3	(Italy) Giovanni Cuniolo	Rudge Whitworth-Pirelli	+ 18' 00"
4	(Belgium) Cyrille van Hauwaert	Alcyon-Dunlop	s.t.
5	(Italy) Giovanni Gerbi	Bianchi-Dunlop	+ 21' 00"
6	(Luxembourg) François Faber	Alcyon-Dunlop	+ 22' 00"
7	(Italy) Carlo Galetti	Rudge Whitworth-Pirelli	+ 26' 00"
8	(Italy) Vincenzo Borgarello	Peugeot-Wolber	+ 30' 00"
9	(France) Omer Beaugendre	Alcyon-Dunlop	+ 38' 30"
10	(Italy) Mario Pesce	–	+ 43' 30"
