= Cesare Zanzottera =

Italian cyclist

Personal information
- Full name: Cesare Zanzottera
- Born: 20 June 1886 Milan, Italy
- Died: 28 June 1961 (aged 75) Milan, Italy

Cycling career
- Sport: Cycling

Cesare Zanzottera (20 June 1886 – 28 June 1961) was an Italian cyclist. He competed in two events at the 1908 Summer Olympics.
