= Giro del Piemonte =

Cycling event

Race details
- Date: Mid-October
- Region: Piedmont, Italy
- English name: Tour of Piedmont
- Local name: Giro del Piemonte or Gran Piemonte (in Italian)
- Discipline: Road
- Competition: UCI ProSeries
- Type: One-day
- Organiser: RCS Sport
- Web site: www.ilgranpiemonte.it/it/

History
- First edition: 1906
- Editions: 109 (as of 2025)
- First winner: Giovanni Gerbi (ITA)
- Most wins: Costante Girardengo (ITA); Aldo Bini (ITA); Gino Bartali (ITA); Fiorenzo Magni (ITA); (3 wins)
- Most recent: Dorian Godon (FRA)

The Giro del Piemonte, since 2009 known also as Gran Piemonte, is a semi classic European bicycle race held in the Piedmont region, Italy. The race first took place in 1906. From 2005–2019, the race was organised as a 1.HC event on the UCI Europe Tour, but with the restructuring of the UCI divisions in 2020, the race has since been held as a 1.Pro event in the UCI ProSeries. It is usually held a few days before the more important race Giro di Lombardia.

In 2007, the race was not ridden because of sponsorship problems, but in 2008 it was back again.

The 2013 edition was again cancelled due to financial problems.

== Winners ==
| Year | Country | Rider | Team |
|---|---|---|---|
| 1906 | Italy | Giovanni Gerbi | Maino |
| 1907 | No race | | |
| 1908 | Italy | Giovanni Gerbi | Maino |
| 1909 | No race | | |
| 1910 | Italy | Vincenzo Borgarello | Bianchi |
| 1911 | Italy | Mario Bruschera | Bianchi |
| 1912 | Italy | Costante Costa | individual |
| 1913 | Italy | Romolo Verde | individual |
| 1914 | Italy | Giuseppe Santhià | Ganna–Dunlop |
| 1915 | Italy | Natale Bosco | individual |
| 1916 | Italy | Francesco Cerutti | individual |
| 1917 | Italy | Domenico Schierano | individual |
| 1918 | Italy | Ugo Bianchi | individual |
| 1919 | Italy | Costante Girardengo | Stucchi–Dunlop |
| 1920 | Italy | Costante Girardengo | Stucchi–Dunlop |
| 1921 | Italy | Giovanni Brunero | Legnano–Pirelli |
| 1922 | Italy | Angelo Gremo | Bianchi-Salga |
| 1923 | Italy | Bartolomeo Aimo | Atala |
| 1924 | Italy | Costante Girardengo | Maino |
| 1925 | Italy | Gaetano Belloni | Wolsit–Pirelli |
| 1926 | Italy | Alfredo Binda | Legnano–Pirelli |
| 1927 | Italy | Alfredo Binda | Legnano–Pirelli |
| 1928 | Italy | Marco Giuntelli | Touring–Pirelli |
| 1929 | Italy | Antonio Negrini | Maino–Clément |
| 1930 | Italy | Ambrogio Morelli | Gloria–Hutchinson |
| 1931 | Italy | Mario Cipriani | individual |
| 1932 | Italy | Giuseppe Martano | individual |
| 1933 | Italy | Antonio Folco | individual |
| 1934 | Italy | Learco Guerra | Maino–Clément |
| 1935 | Italy | Aldo Bini | Maino–Girardengo |
| 1936 | Italy | Aldo Bini | Maino |
| 1937 | Italy | Gino Bartali | Legnano |
| 1938 | Italy | Pietro Rimoldi | Ganna |
| 1939 | Italy | Gino Bartali | Legnano |
| 1940 | Italy | Cino Cinelli | Bianchi |
| 1941 | Italy | Aldo Bini | Bianchi |
| 1942 | Italy | Fiorenzo Magni | Bianchi |
| 1943–1944 | No race | | |
| 1945 | Italy | Secondo Barisone | individual |
| 1946 | Italy | Sergio Maggini | Benotto–Superga |
| 1947 | Italy | Vito Ortelli | Benotto–Superga |
| 1948 | Italy | Renzo Soldani | individual |
| 1949 | Italy | Adolfo Leoni | Legnano–Pirelli |
| 1950 | Italy | Alfredo Martini | Taurea–Pirelli |
| 1951 | Italy | Gino Bartali | Bartali–Ursus |
| 1952 | Italy | Giorgio Albani | Legnano |
| 1953 | Italy | Fiorenzo Magni | Ganna–Ursus |
| 1954 | Italy | Nino Defilippis | Torpado–Ursus |
| 1955 | Italy | Giuseppe Minardi | Legnano |
| 1956 | Italy | Fiorenzo Magni | Nivea–Fuchs |
| 1957 | Italy | Silvano Ciampi | Faema–Guerra |
| 1958 | Italy | Nino Defilippis | Carpano |
| 1959 | Italy | Silvano Ciampi | Bianchi–Pirelli |
| 1960 | Italy | Alfredo Sabbadin | Philco |
| 1961 | Italy | Angelo Conterno | Baratti–Milano |
| 1962 | Italy | Vito Taccone | Atala |
| 1963 | Italy | Adriano Durante | Legnano |
| 1964 | Belgium | Willy Bocklant | Flandria–Romeo |
| 1965 | Italy | Romeo Venturelli | Bianchi-Mobylette |
| 1966 | West Germany | Rudi Altig | Molteni |
| 1968 | No race | | |
| 1967 | Italy | Guido De Rosso | Vittadello |
| 1969 | Italy | Marino Basso | Molteni |
| 1970 | Italy | Italo Zilioli | Faemino–Faema |
| 1971 | Italy | Felice Gimondi | Salvarani |
| 1972 | Belgium | Eddy Merckx | Molteni |
| 1973 | Italy | Felice Gimondi | Bianchi–Campagnolo |
| 1974 | Italy | Francesco Moser | Filotex |
| 1975–1976 | No race | | |
| 1977 | Belgium | Roger De Vlaeminck | Brooklyn |
| 1978 | Italy | Gianbattista Baronchelli | Scic |
| 1979 | Italy | Silvano Contini | Bianchi–Faema |
| 1980 | Italy | Gianbattista Baronchelli | Bianchi–Piaggio |
| 1981 | Italy | Marino Amadori | Magniflex |
| 1982 | Spain | Faustino Rupérez | Zor–Helios |
| 1983 | Italy | Guido Bontempi | Inoxpran |
| 1984 | France | Christian Jourdan | La Vie Claire |
| 1985 | France | Charly Mottet | Renault–Elf |
| 1986 | Italy | Gianni Bugno | Atala–Ofmega |
| 1987 | Netherlands | Adrie Van Der Poel | PDM–Ultima–Concorde |
| 1988 | West Germany | Rolf Gölz | Superconfex–Yoko–Opel–Colnago |
| 1989 | Italy | Claudio Chiappucci | Carrera Jeans–Vagabond |
| 1990 | Italy | Franco Ballerini | Del Tongo |
| 1991 | Uzbekistan | Djamolidine Abdoujaparov | Carrera Jeans–Tassoni |
| 1992 | Netherlands | Erik Breukink | PDM–Ultima–Concorde |
| 1993 | Switzerland | Beat Zberg | Carrera Jeans–Tassoni |
| 1994 | Italy | Nicola Miceli | Carrera Jeans–Tassoni |
| 1995 | Italy | Claudio Chiappucci | Carrera Jeans–Tassoni |
| 1996 | France | Richard Virenque | Festina–Lotus |
| 1997 | Italy | Gianluca Bortolami | Festina–Lotus |
| 1998 | Italy | Marco Serpellini | Brescialat–Liquigas |
| 1999 | Italy | Andrea Tafi | Mapei–Quick-Step |
| 2000 | No race | | |
| 2001 | Belgium | Nico Mattan | Cofidis |
| 2002 | Italy | Luca Paolini | Mapei–Quick-Step |
| 2003 | Italy | Alessandro Bertolini | Alessio |
| 2004 | Australia | Allan Davis | Liberty Seguros |
| 2005 | Brazil | Murilo Fischer | Naturino–Sapore di Mare |
| 2006 | Italy | Daniele Bennati | Lampre–Fondital |
| 2007 | No race | | |
| 2008 | Italy | Daniele Bennati | Liquigas |
| 2009 | Belgium | Philippe Gilbert | Silence–Lotto |
| 2010 | Belgium | Philippe Gilbert | Omega Pharma–Lotto |
| 2011 | Spain | Daniel Moreno | Team Katusha |
| 2012 | Colombia | Rigoberto Urán | Team Sky |
| 2013–2014 | No race | | |
| 2015 | Belgium | Jan Bakelants | AG2R La Mondiale |
| 2016 | Italy | Giacomo Nizzolo | Italian national selection |
| 2017 | Italy | Fabio Aru | Astana |
| 2018 | Italy | Sonny Colbrelli | Bahrain–Merida |
| 2019 | Colombia | Egan Bernal | Team INEOS |
| 2020 | New Zealand | George Bennett | Team Jumbo–Visma |
| 2021 | Great Britain | Matt Walls | Bora–Hansgrohe |
| 2022 | Spain | Iván García Cortina | Movistar Team |
| 2023 | Italy | Andrea Bagioli | Soudal–Quick-Step |
| 2024 | United States | Neilson Powless | EF Education–EasyPost |
| 2025 | Mexico | Isaac del Toro | UAE Team Emirates XRG |
| 2026 | France | Dorian Godon | Netcompany INEOS |

== Wins per country ==
| Wins | Country |
|---|---|
| 82 | Italy |
| 7 | Belgium |
| 4 | France |
| 3 | Spain |
| 2 | Germany; Netherlands; Colombia |
| 1 | Uzbekistan; Switzerland; Australia; Brazil; New Zealand; United Kingdom; United States; Mexico |
