= Pietro Fasoli =

Italian cyclist

Personal information
- Born: 25 October 1891
- Died: date unknown

Cycling career
- Sport: Cycling
- Role: Rider

Pietro Fasoli (born 25 October 1891, date of death unknown) was an Italian racing cyclist. He rode in the 1919 Tour de France.
