= Cesare Brambilla =

Italian cyclist

Personal information
- Born: 3 May 1885 Bernareggio, Italy
- Died: 3 March 1954 (aged 68) Milan, Italy

Cycling career
- Sport: Cycling
- Role: Rider

Cesare Brambilla (3 May 1885 – 3 March 1954) was an Italian racing cyclist. He won the 1906 edition of the Giro di Lombardia.
