= Atala (cycling team) =

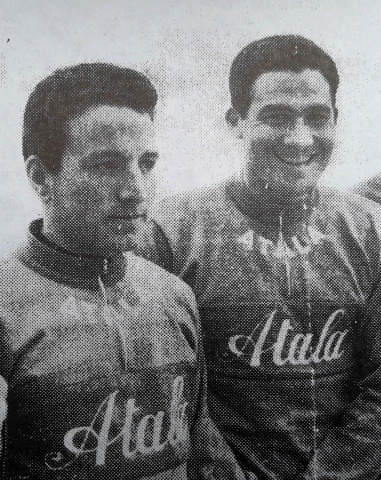
- Vito Taccone and Giovanni Cordovani c. 1961–1962

Team information
- UCI code: ATA
- Registered: Italy
- Founded: 1908
- Disbanded: 1989
- Discipline: Road

Team name history
- 1908 1909 1910 1911–1912 1913 1914 1915, 1923, 1925 1928 1932 1946 1947 1948–1957 1958 1959 1960-1962, 1982–1985 1986–1988 1989: Atala; Atala–Dunlop; Atala–Continental; Atala–Dunlop; Atala; Atala–Dunlop; Atala; Atala–Pirelli; Atala; Atala–Lygie; Atala–Pirelli; Atala; Atala–Pirelli; Atala–Pirelli–Lygie; Atala; Atala–Ofmega; Atala–Campagnolo

Atala (UCI team code: ATA) was a cycling team that was created in 1908 and officially retired in 1989. In 1912, the 1912 Giro d'Italia was contested by teams, and Team Atala, consisting of Carlo Galetti, Giovanni Micheletto and Eberardo Pavesi emerged as the winner (Luigi Ganna, also member of the team, retired during the fifth stage).

== Major wins ==
=== One-day races ===
- Giro di Lombardia
  - 1932: Antonio Negrini (Italy)
  - 1961: Vito Taccone Italy

=== Grand Tours ===
==== Tour de France ====
- Stages: (1 in 1932, 2 in 1955, 2 in 1956, 1 in 1958, 1 in 1959)

==== Giro d'Italia ====
- General Classification:
  - 1909 - Luigi Ganna (Italy)
  - 1910 - Carlo Galetti (Italy)
  - 1912 - Team Atala (Carlo Galetti, Giovanni Micheletto, Eberardo Pavesi) (Italy)
- Points Classification:
  - 1984 - Urs Freuler Switzerland
- Mountains Classification:
  - 1961 - Vito Taccone Italy
- Stages: (3 in 1909, 7 in 1910, 3 in 1912, 3 in 1948, 3 in 1949, 3 in 1951, 1 in 1954, 3 in 1955, 3 in 1956, 3 in 1957, 4 in 1959, 1 in 1961, 3 in 1982, 3 in 1983, 4 in 1984, 4 in 1985, 3 in 1987, 1 in 1988)
