= Attilio Zavatti =

Italian cyclist (1888–1943)

Personal information
- Born: 8 March 1888 Forlì, Italy
- Died: 21 December 1943 (aged 55) Forlì, Italy

Cycling career
- Sport: Cycling
- Discipline: Road
- Role: Rider

Professional teams
- 1909: Legnano–Pirelli
- 1911: Vigor

Attilio Zavatti, also written as Attilio Zavati, (8 March 1888 – 21 December 1943) was an Italian professional road racing cyclist who competed during the late 1900s and early 1910s.

Zavatti is most known for being the first person to complete two Grand Tours, both the Giro d'Italia and the Tour de France, in the same season. Of the four cyclists who achieved this in 1909, Zavatti recorded the best General Classification results.

== Biography ==
=== Personal life ===
Zavatti was born in Forlì, Italy, in 1888. He was a Bersagliere, a soldier in the Italian army, being stationed in Livorno.

In 1909 Zavatti became the first cyclist to complete two Grand Tours, both the Giro d'Italia and the Tour de France, in the same season, setting a precedent that would later become one of cycling's greatest endurance achievements. Of the four cyclist who achieved this, Zavati recorded the best General Classification results.

Zavatti finished 14th overall in the 1909 Giro d'Italia, completing the race as one of only 49 finishers from 115 starters. He rode the Giro without a team on a Legnano bicycle. Following the performances of two riders using Legnano bicycles during the Giro, the Legnano–Pirelli team was founded. Zavatti was among the team's first riders, together with five other cyclists. With the team he rode the 1909 Tour de France, just 36 days after the Giro. He placed 15th overall, finishing among 55 riders from a field of 150 starters. And so Zavatti became, together with Ildebrando Gamberini, Angelo Magagnoli and Amleto Belloni, the first cyclist to finish both the Giro and Tour the same year. In 1909 these two tours consisted of 22 stages with a total of 6944.9 kilometres. In both these Grand Tours he also had top-10 achievements in stages. In the 1909 Giro d'Italia he placed seventh on the opening stage from Milan to Bologna and tenth on the final stage to Milan. In the 1909 Tour de France he finished 10th on Stage 6 from Grenoble to Nice.

In 1911 he rode with the Vigor cycling team. Before taking part in the 1911 Giro d'Italia, he set a record for the ascent of Montenero in Livorno on 12 April 1911, climbing from Piazza delle Carrozze to Piazza del Santuario in 4 minutes and 3.8 seconds, improving the previous record of 5 minutes and 27 seconds held by Ligurian Vergassola. In the 1911 Giro d'Italia he achieved a fourth place on stage 8 from Bologna to Ancona, ninth place on stage 9 and eighth on the final stage to Rome. He also competed in one-day main international cycling monuments, including 1909 Milan–San Remo, 1910 Milan–San Remo and 1911 Giro di Lombardia and the inaugural edition of the cycling classic Giro di Romagna in 1910.

After his cycling career, Zavatti remained involved in cycling. He was the uncle of Italian cyclist Glauco Servadei (1913–1968), who became a professional rider and stage winner in both the Giro d'Italia and Tour de France. Zavatti helped encourage his nephew's early career and prepared his first racing bicycle when Servadei began competing as a teenager.

Zavatti died in Forlì, Italy] on 21 December 1943, during World War II, at the age of 55 years old.

== Major results ==
1909
15th Overall Tour de France
14th Overall Giro d'Italia

7th Stage 1
10th Stage 8

1911
18th Overall Giro d'Italia

4th Stage 8
9th Stage 9
8th Stage 12

=== Grand Tour and classic results timeline ===
| Grand Tour | 1909 | 1910 | 1911 |
|---|---|---|---|
| Tour de France | 15th | — | — |
| Giro d'Italia | 14th | — | 18th |
| Monument | 1909 | 1910 | 1911 |
| Milan–San Remo | 56th | DNF | — |
| Giro di Lombardia | — | — | 39th |
| Classic | 1909 | 1910 | 1911 |
| Giro di Romagna | Not held | DQ | — |
