= Ottorino Celli =

Italian cyclist

Personal information
- Born: 1890 Rome, Italy
- Died: Unknown

Cycling career
- Sport: Cycling

Ottorino Celli (born 1890) was an Italian cyclist. He rode in the 1909 Giro d'Italia.
