= Giovanni Cuniolo =

Italian cyclist

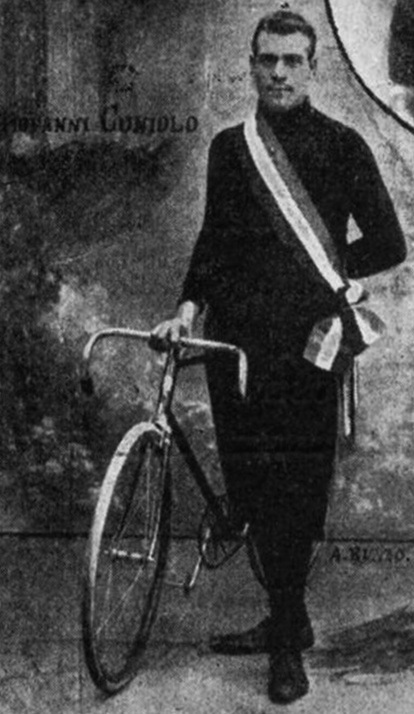
- Cuniolo posing beside a bike

Personal information
- Full name: Giovanni Cuniolo
- Born: 25 June 1884 Tortona, Italy
- Died: 25 December 1955 (aged 71)

Cycling career
- Sport: Cycling
- Discipline: Road
- Role: Rider

Professional teams
- 1903: Individual
- 1904: Maino
- 1905: Bianchi
- 1906: Rudge Whitworth
- 1907: Maino
- 1908: Bianchi/Peugeot-Wolber
- 1909: Rudge Whitworth-Pirelli
- 1910: Bianchi
- 1911–12: Individual
- 1913: Atala-Dunlop

Major wins
- Grand Tours Giro d'Italia 1 stage (1909)

Giovanni Cuniolo (25 June 1884 – 25 December 1955) was an Italian professional road racing cyclist who was born in Tortona, Italy. He won the second ever stage in Giro d'Italia history in 1909.
