= Carlo Galetti =

Italian cyclist (1882–1949)

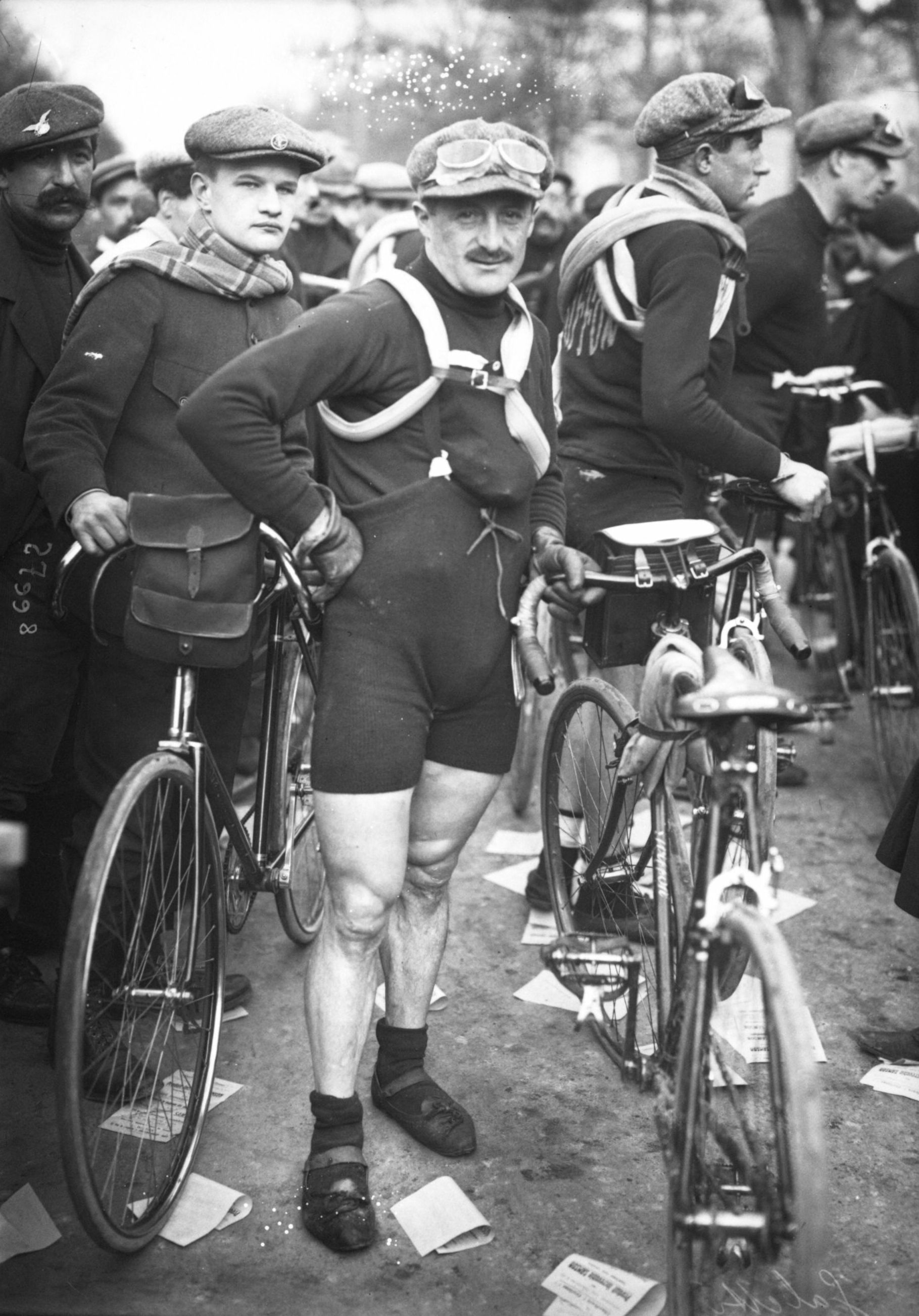
- Galetti in 1913

Personal information
- Full name: Carlo Galetti
- Nicknames: Lo Scoiattolo dei Navigli (The Squirrel of the Canals), The Human Stopwatch
- Born: 26 August 1882 Corsico, Italy
- Died: 2 April 1949 (aged 66) Milan, Italy

Cycling career
- Sport: Cycling
- Role: Rider

Professional teams
- 1901–1905: Individual
- 1906–1907: Rudge Whitwort/OTAV
- 1908: Alycon/Atala
- 1909: Legnano/Rudge Whitworth-Pirelli
- 1910: Medusa
- 1911: Bianchi
- 1912: Atala/Senior-Polack
- 1913: Legnano
- 1914: Bianchi

Major wins
- Grand Tours Giro d'Italia General classification (1910, 1911, 1912) 6 individual stages (1910, 1911, 1912) Stage races Giro di Sicilia (1907, 1908) One-day races and Classics Roma-Napoli-Roma (1906)

Carlo Galetti (26 August 1882 – 2 April 1949) was an Italian professional road racing cyclist.

He was born at Corsico. The highlight of his career was his three consecutive overall wins in the 1910, 1911 and 1912 Giros d'Italia, the last of which was won as part of Team Atala along with Giovanni Micheletto and Eberardo Pavesi.

He died in Milan in 1949.

== Major results ==
1904
1st Campionato Brianzola
1st Menaggio–Como–Lecco–Menaggio
2nd Dongo–Gera–Dongo

1905
1st Campionato Brianzola
3rd Coppa Desio
3rd Legnano–Gravellona–Legnano
3rd Coppa Morbegno

1906
1st Overall Milano–Bologna–Roma

1st Stage 2

1st Roma–Napoli–Roma
1st Gran Fondo, La Seicento Corza Nazionale
2nd Giro di Lombardia
2nd Coppa Val d'Olona
3rd Milano–Giovi–Milano
3rd Milano–Pontedecimo
3rd Brescia–Milano–Pallanza

1907
1st Overall Giro di Sicilia

1st Stages 1, 3, 4, 6 & 8

1st Firenze–Roma
2nd Corsa Regina Madre
2nd Milano–Bergamo–Como
2nd Milano–Bologna–Firenze
2nd Giro del Piemonte

1908
1st Overall Giro di Sicilia

1st Stages 1, 3 & 6

1st Corsa Vittorio Emanuele III e Regina Madre
1st Coppa Tradate
2nd Road Race, National Road Championships
2nd Gran Fondo, La Seicento Corza Nazionale
2nd Coppa Savona
2nd Tre Coppe Parabiago
3rd Giro del Piemonte

1909
2nd Overall Giro d'Italia
2nd Tre Coppe Parabiago
2nd Coppa Savona
3rd Coppa Bastogi
7th Milan–San Remo

1910
1st Overall Giro d'Italia

1st Stages 3 & 8

1st Overall Ai mari ai laghi ai monti

1st Stages 4 & 8

1st Tre Coppe Parabiago
2nd Giro di Romagna-Toscana
3rd Overall Roma–Napoli–Roma

1911
1st Overall Giro d'Italia

1st Stages 1, 4 & 10

1st Tre Coppe Parabiago
2nd Overall Roma–Napoli–Roma
2nd Giro del Piemonte
4th Milan–San Remo

1912
1st Overall Giro d'Italia

1st Stage 5

1st Milano–Sesto San Giovanni Chrono
2nd Gran Fondo, La Seicento Corza Nazionale
10th Milan–San Remo

1913
8th Giro di Lombardia

1914
2nd Milan–San Remo

1915
4th Milan–San Remo

1918
1st Overall Milano–Bologna–Roma

1st Stage 2

3rd Giro di Lombardia

1919
1st National Track Championships, Individual Pursuit
2nd Gran Fondo, La Seicento Corza Nazionale
5th Milan–San Remo

1920
2nd Overall Giro della Provincia Milano

1921
9th Milan–San Remo
