= Mario Bruschera =

Italian cyclist

Personal information
- Full name: Mario Bruschera
- Born: 16 April 1887 Milan, Italy
- Died: 23 February 1968 (aged 80) Milan, [taly

Cycling career
- Sport: Cycling
- Role: Rider

Professional teams
- 1909–10: Atala Dunlop
- 1909–15: Bianchi

Major wins
- One-day races and Classics Giro del Piemonte (1911) Coppa Val d'Olona (1909)

Mario Bruschera (16 April 1887 – 23 February 1968) was an Italian professional road racing cyclist. He competed at the 1912 Giro d'Italia.
