= Clemente Canepari =

Italian cyclist

Personal information
- Born: 11 November 1886 Pieve Porto Morone, Italy
- Died: 13 September 1966 (aged 79) San Colombano al Lambro, Italy

Cycling career
- Sport: Cycling
- Role: Rider

Clemente Canepari (11 November 1886 – 13 September 1966) was an Italian racing cyclist. He finished in fourth place in the 1909 Giro d'Italia.
