= Enrico Sala =

Italian cyclist

Personal information
- Born: 12 June 1891 Milan, Italy
- Died: 3 August 1979 (aged 88) Milan, Italy

Cycling career
- Sport: Cycling
- Role: Rider

Enrico Sala (12 June 1891 – 3 August 1979) was an Italian racing cyclist. He finished in eighth place in the 1909 Giro d'Italia.
