= Ernesto Azzini =

Italian cyclist

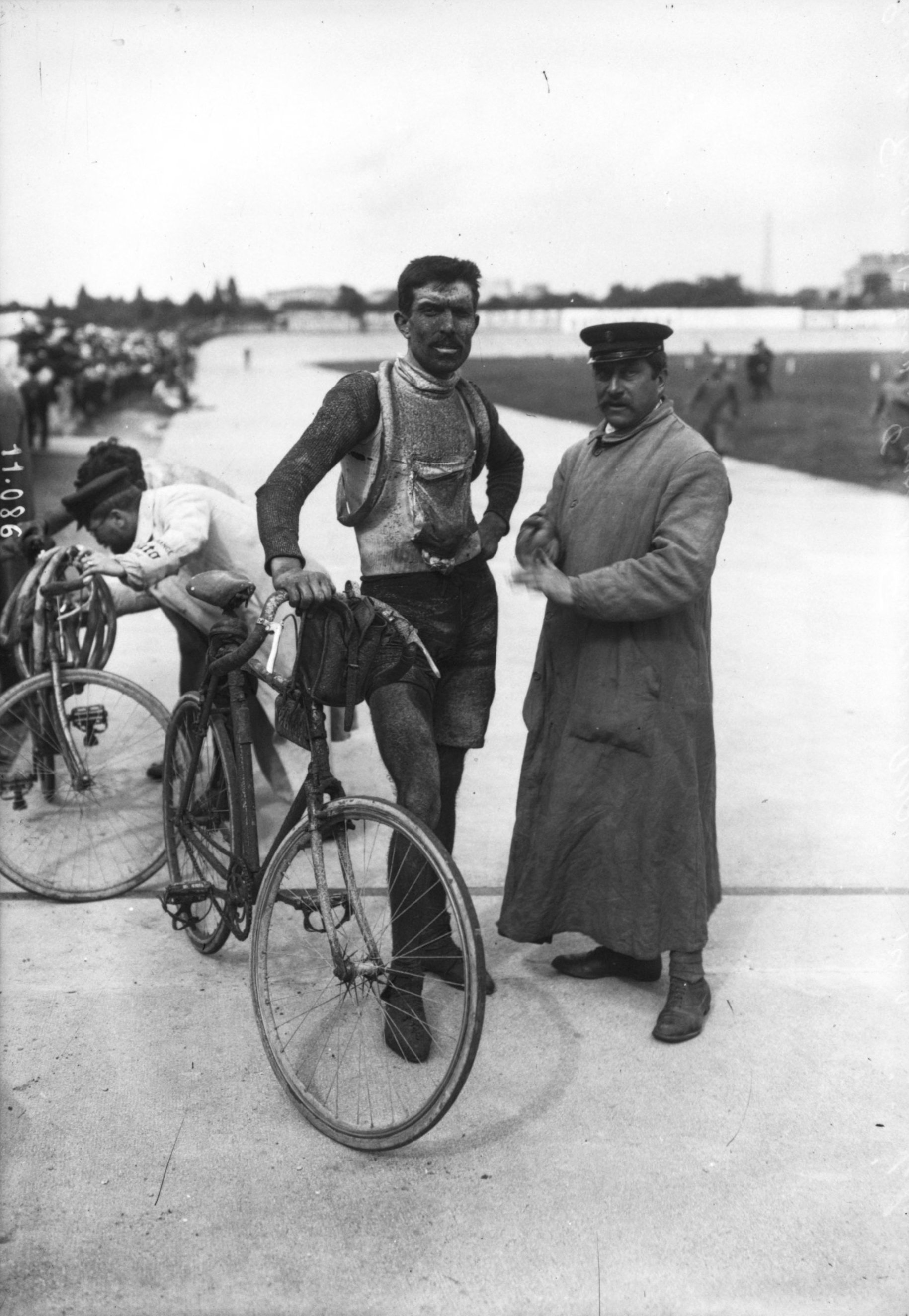

Personal information
- Full name: Ernesto Azzini
- Nickname: El du meter
- Born: 17 October 1885 Rodigo, Italy
- Died: 14 July 1923 (aged 37) Milan, Italy

Cycling career
- Sport: Cycling
- Discipline: Road
- Role: Rider

Major wins
- Grand Tours Tour de France 1 individual stage (1910) Giro d'Italia 2 individual stages (1910, 1912) One-day races and Classics GP Peugeot (1907)

Ernesto Azzini (17 October 1885 – 14 July 1923) was an Italian professional road bicycle racer. He was the first Italian cyclist to win a stage in the Tour de France, in 1910.

== Major results ==
1907
GP Peugeot
1908
Milan-Verona
Sanremo-Vintimille-Sanremo
1910
Coppa Savone
Giro d'Italia:

Winner stage 1

Tour de France:

Winner stage 15

1912
Milan
Giro d'Italia:

Winner stage 3
