= Dario Beni =

Italian cyclist

Personal information
- Full name: Dario Beni
- Born: 1 January 1889 Rome, Italy
- Died: 11 February 1969 (aged 80) Rome, Italy

Cycling career
- Sport: Cycling
- Role: Rider

Professional teams
- 1907: Individual
- 1908: S.C. Roma
- 1909: Legnano
- 1909?: Peugeot
- 1909?: Turkheimer
- 1910–12: Bianchi
- 1913–14: Peugeot
- 1913–14?: Stucchi
- 1915–1918: Individual
- 1919: Peugeot
- 1920–1921: Individual

Major wins
- Grand Tours Giro d'Italia 3 individual stages (1909, 1911) One-day races and Classics National Road Race Championships (1909, 1911) Giro della Romagna (1912)

Dario Beni (1 January 1889 – 2 February 1969) was an Italian professional road racing cyclist who was born in Rome, Italy. He won the first ever stage in Giro d'Italia history in 1909. In total he won three stages at the Giro d'Italia.
