= Luigi Ganna =

Italian cyclist (1883–1957)

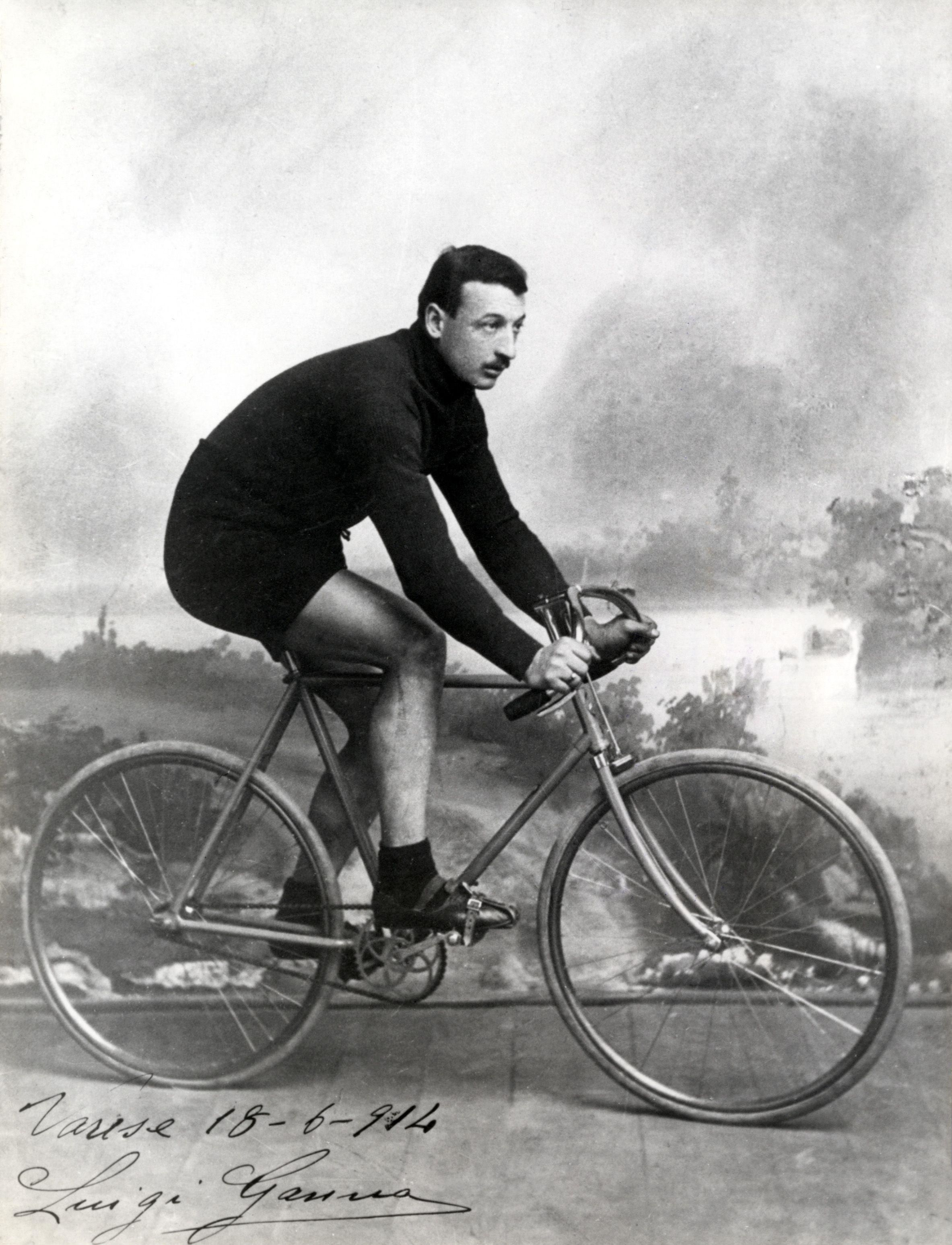
- Luigi Ganna, posing in a studio in Varese, Kingdom of Italy, 18 June 1914

Personal information
- Full name: Luigi Ganna
- Born: 1 December 1883 Induno Olona, Kingdom of Italy
- Died: 2 October 1957 (aged 73) Varese, Italy

Cycling career
- Sport: Cycling
- Discipline: Road
- Role: Rider

Professional teams
- 1904: Individual
- 1905: Rudge Whitwort
- 1906: Bianchi/Rudge Whitwort
- 1907: Turkheimer
- 1908: Alycon/Atala
- 1909–1911: Atala
- 1912: Atala/Ganna
- 1913–1915: Ganna

Major wins
- Grand Tours Giro d'Italia General classification (1909) 6 individual stages (1909, 1910) One-day races and Classics Milan–San Remo (1909) Giro dell'Emilia (1910)

Luigi Ganna (1 December 1883 – 2 October 1957) was an Italian professional road racing cyclist. He was the overall winner of the first Giro d'Italia, held in 1909, as well as the first Italian winner of the classic Milan–San Remo earlier that year. Further highlights in his career were his fifth place in the 1908 Tour de France and several podium places in Italian classic races. In 1908, he set a new Italian hour record, which he held for six years.

He was born in Induno Olona, near Varese, in Lombardy. Before becoming a professional cyclist, he worked as a bricklayer, commuting up to 100 km to work by bike.

In 1912, he started a bike brand named Ganna which was still around in 2012. In 1913, he started the Ganna Cycling team where he rode for the final three years of his career. His company sponsored the team until 1953 when they could no longer meet obligations and Nivea–Fuchs took over.

== Major results ==
1905
3rd Giro di Lombardia
1906
3rd Giro di Lombardia
3rd Giro del Piemonte
1907
2nd Overall Giro di Sicilia

1st 2 Stages

3rd Giro di Lombardia
4th Milan–San Remo
1908
2nd Milan–San Remo
2nd Giro di Lombardia
3rd Roma–Napoli–Roma
5th Tour de France
1909
1st Overall Giro d'Italia

1st Stages 4, 5 & 7

1st Milan-San Remo
3rd Giro dell'Emilia
6th Giro di Lombardia
1910
1st Giro dell'Emilia
2nd Giro di Lombardia
2nd Italian National Road Race Championships
2nd Roma–Napoli–Roma
3rd Overall Giro d'Italia

1st Stages 5, 7 & 10

1911
3rd Milan–San Remo
1913
3rd Roma–Napoli–Roma

1st Stage 1

5th Giro d'Italia
1914
6th Milan–San Remo

== Bibliography ==
- Gregori, Claudio (2009). Luigi Ganna – Il romanzo del vincitore del primo Giro d'Italia del 1909 [Luigi Ganna – The romance of the winner of the first Giro d'Italia in 1909] (in Italian). Cassina de' Pecchi (Milan), Italy: Edizioni Roberto Vallardi. ISBN 978-88-95684-23-9.
