= Giovanni Rossignoli =

Italian cyclist

Personal information
- Full name: Giovanni Rossignoli
- Born: 3 December 1882 Pavia, Italy
- Died: 27 June 1954 (aged 71) Pavia, Italy

Cycling career
- Sport: Cycling
- Discipline: Road
- Role: Rider

Major wins
- Giro d'Italia, 3 stages; Corsa Nazionale (1903); Milano–Torino (1905); Milano–Mantova (1906); Coppa Val d'Olona (1907)

Giovanni Rossignoli (3 December 1882 – 27 June 1954) was an Italian professional road bicycle racer who won 3 Giro d'Italia stages during his career.

== Palmares ==
1903
1st Corsa Nazionale
1905
1st Milano–Torino
1906
1st Milano–Mantova
1907
1st Coppa Val d'Olona
1908
10th Overall classification Tour de France
1909
1st Stage 3 Giro d'Italia
1st Stage 6 Giro d'Italia
3rd Overall classification Giro d'Italia
1911
1st Stage 3 Giro d'Italia
2nd Overall classification Giro d'Italia
1912
3rd Overall classification Giro d'Italia

== Bibliography ==
- Gregori, Claudio (2019). Il Romanzo di Baslot—Vita e Imprese di Giovanni Rossignoli [The Tale of Baslot—Life and Ventures of Giovanni Rossignoli] (in Italian). Bergamo, Italy: Bolis Edizioni. ISBN 978-88-7827-413-6.
