= Giovanni Gerbi =

Italian cyclist

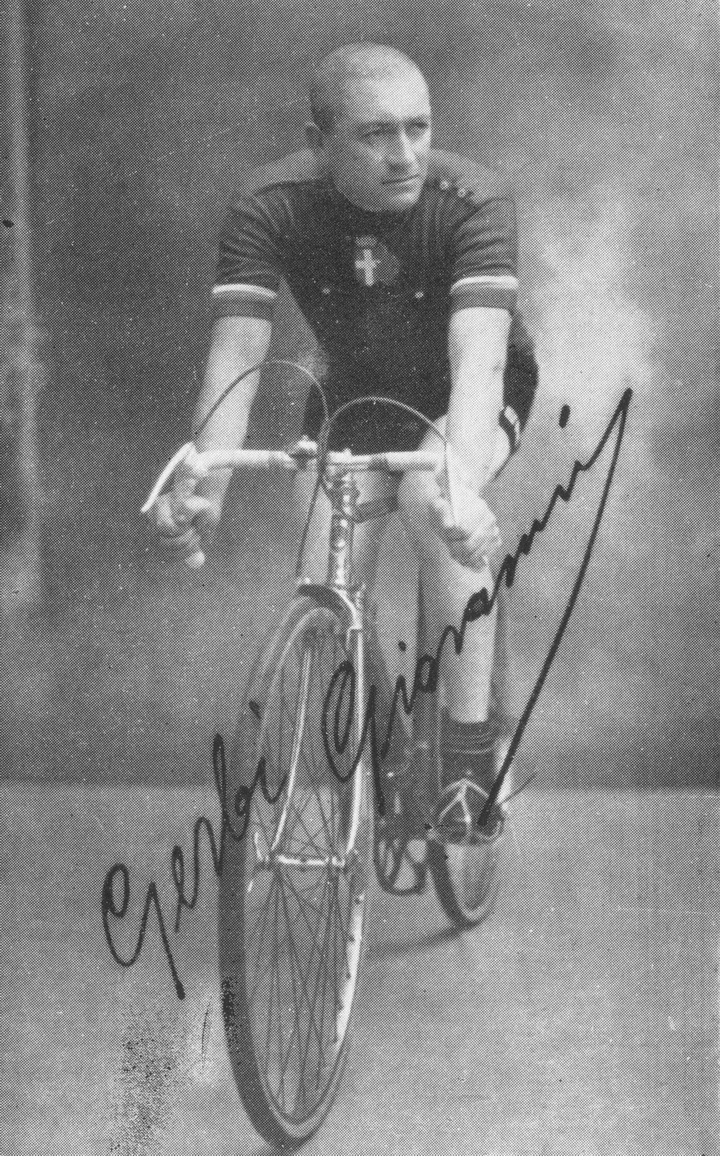

Personal information
- Full name: Giovanni Gerbi
- Nickname: Diavolo Rosso (The Red Devil)
- Born: 20 May 1885 Trincere, Italy
- Died: 6 May 1955 (aged 69) Asti, Italy

Cycling career
- Sport: Cycling
- Discipline: Road
- Role: Rider

Major wins
- Coppa del Re (1902, 1903); Milano–Torino (1903); Circuito di Alessandria (1905); Corza Nazionale (1905, 1907, 1908); Giro di Lombardia (1905); Brescia–Milano–Pallanza (1906); Giro del Piemonte (1906, 1907, 1908); Milano–Alessandria–Milano (1906); Milano–Pontedecimo (1906); Roma–Napoli–Roma (1907, 1908, 1909)

Giovanni Gerbi (20 May 1885 – 6 May 1955) was an Italian road racing cyclist.

He was nicknamed the "red devil", due to his red jersey and his "never-say-die" attitude.

In 1905, he won the first Giro di Lombardia. In 1911, he finished third in the Giro d'Italia. He held the world "6 hours" record in 1913 with 208.161 km. Between 1921 and 1925, he did not race. He began racing again in 1926. Failing to get a single result, he retired from racing. In 1932, he took part in the Italian Championships for veterans, which he won. He repeated this performance in 1933.

Gerbi died in Asti in 1955. In 1982, Paolo Conte dedicated a song on his album "Appunti di viaggio" to him: "Red devil forget the road, come here with us to drink an orangeade, against the light all the time goes away..."
