= Eberardo Pavesi =

Italian cyclist

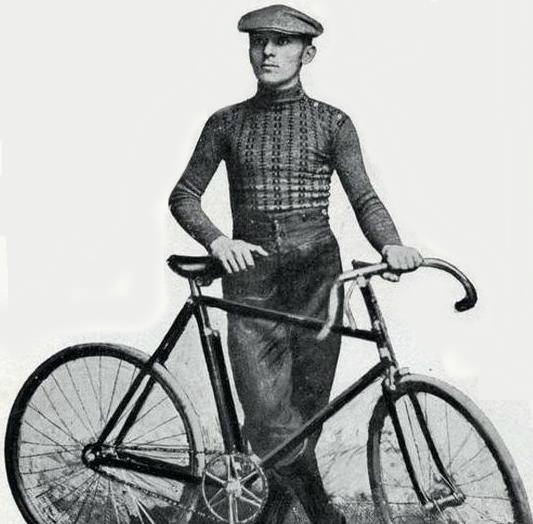

Personal information
- Full name: Eberardo Pavesi
- Born: 2 November 1883 Colturano, Italy
- Died: 11 November 1974 (aged 91) Milan, Italy

Cycling career
- Sport: Cycling
- Discipline: Road
- Role: Rider

Professional teams
- 1904: Pirovano
- 1905: Rudge Whitworth
- 1906–1907: Otav
- 1908: Alcyon-Dunlop
- 1908–1912: Atala
- 1910: Medusa
- 1911-1912: Bianchi
- 1912: Fiat
- 1913: Legnano
- 1913: JB Louvet - Continental
- 1914: Bianchi - Pirelli
- 1914: Dei - Pirelli
- 1918-1919: Dei

Managerial team
- 1921–1966: Legnano

Major wins
- Grand Tours Giro d'Italia General classification (1912) 4 individual stages (1910, 1913) One-day races and Classics Giro dell'Emilia (1909) Milano-Bergamo-Como (1907)

Eberardo Pavesi (2 November 1883 – 11 November 1974) was an Italian professional road racing cyclist.

Pavesi was born in Colturano, province of Milan.

The highlight of his career was at the 1912 Giro d'Italia when he rode with the victorious Atala team, the General classification being contested by teams rather than by individual riders that year.

He was later a team director, having under him racers such as Gino Bartali. He died in Milan in 1974.
