= List of Giro d'Italia general classification winners =

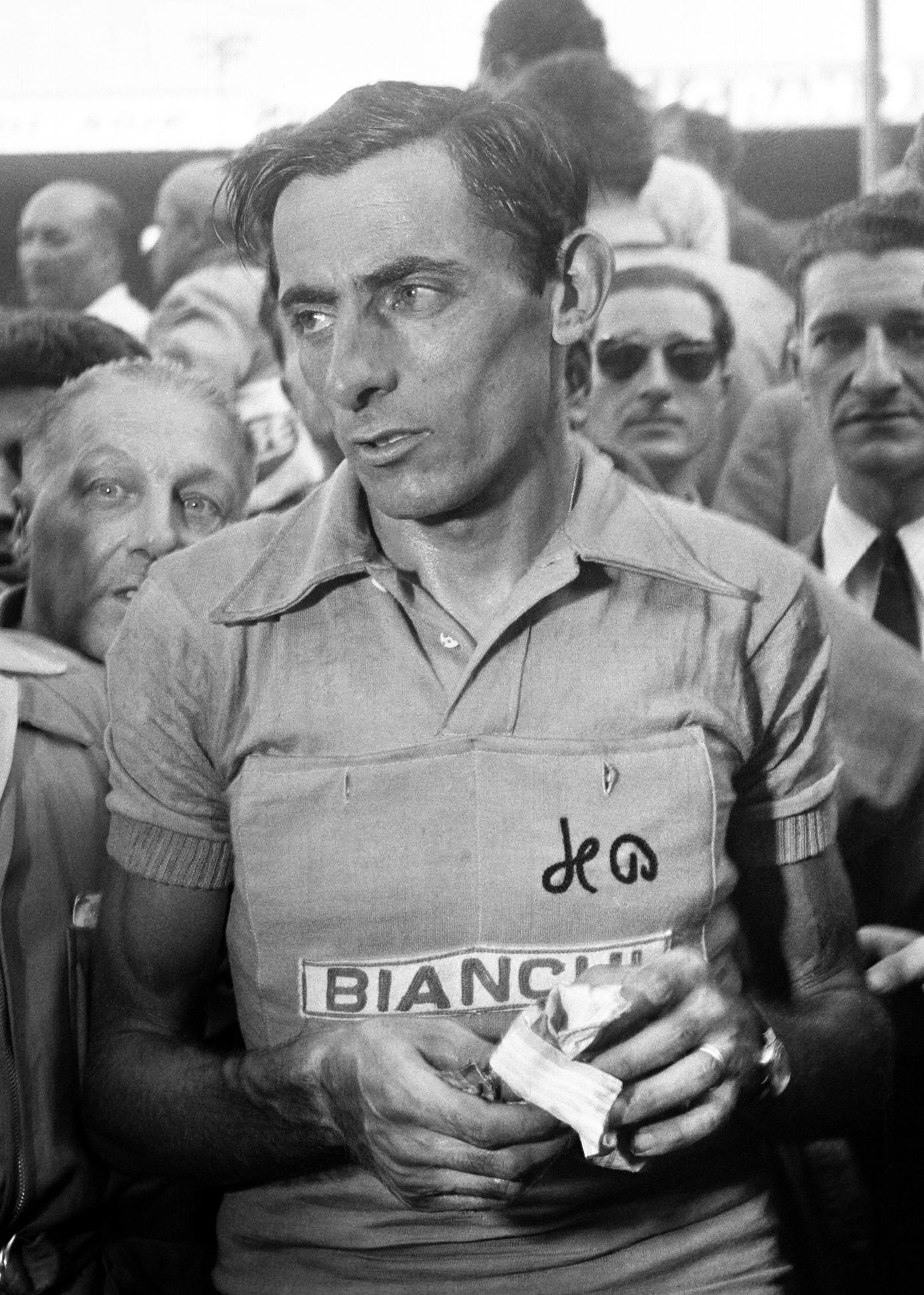
Fausto Coppi, who won the Giro d'Italia five times between 1940 and 1953

The Giro d'Italia is an annual road bicycle race held in May. Established in 1909 by newspaper La Gazzetta dello Sport, the Giro is one of cycling's three "Grand Tours"; along with the Tour de France and the Vuelta a España. The race usually covers approximately 3,500 kilometres (2,200 mi), passing through Italy and neighbouring countries such as France. The race is broken into day-long segments, called stages. Individual finishing times for each stage are totalled to determine the overall winner at the end of the race. The course changes every year, but has traditionally finished in Milan.

The rider with the lowest aggregate time at the end of each day is leader of the general classification, and since 1931 wears a pink jersey. Other classifications have also been added, and sometimes removed; the leaders of some of these classifications were also indicated with jerseys, whose colours have varied over the years. As of 2011, the Ciclamino(purple) jersey is worn by the leader of the points classification; the Blue jersey is worn by the leader of the mountains classification and the white jersey is worn by the leader of the young rider classification.

Alfredo Binda, Fausto Coppi and Eddy Merckx have the most Giro victories, each of them having won the competition five times. Coppi is the youngest winner of the Giro; he was 20 years, 158 days old when he won the 1940 Giro d'Italia. The oldest winner of the Giro is Fiorenzo Magni, who was 34 years old, 180 days when he won the 1955 Giro d'Italia. The fastest victory in the Giro was in 1983, when Giuseppe Saronni won at an average speed of 38.937 kilometres per hour (24.194 mph). Italian cyclists have won the most Giros; 41 cyclists have won 68 Giros between them. Belgian cyclists are second with seven victories, and French riders are third with six wins. The current champion is Jonas Vingegaard of UCI WorldTeam Visma–Lease a Bike who won the 2026 Giro d'Italia.

== History ==
In 1909, the newspaper La Gazzetta dello Sport established the Giro d'Italia, inspired by the success of the Tour de France, which started in 1903. The first Giro was won by Luigi Ganna, while Carlo Galetti won the two following Giros. In 1912, there was no individual classification; instead, there was only a team classification, which was won by Team Atala. The 1912 Giro is the only time the competition has not had an individual classification. From 1914 onwards, the scoring format was changed from a points-based system to a time-based system, in which the cyclist who had the lowest aggregate time at the end of the race would win. The Giro was suspended for four years from 1915 to 1918, due to the First World War. Costante Girardengo was the winner of the first Giro after the war in 1919.

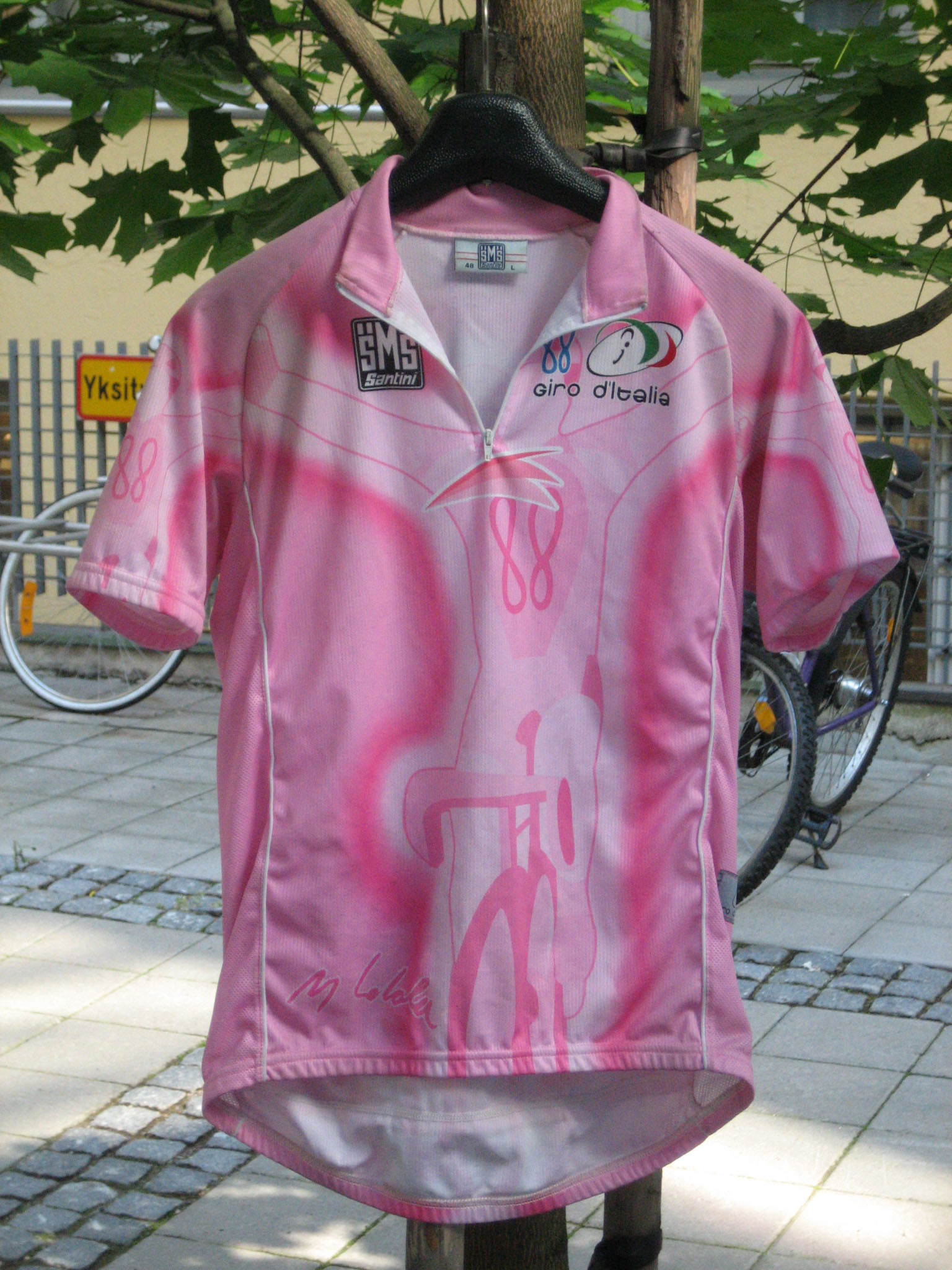
The Pink Jersey (Italian: Maglia rosa) worn by the leader of the general classification

The dominant figure in the 1920s was Alfredo Binda, who won his first Giro in 1925 and followed this up with another victory in 1927, in which he won 12 of the 15 stages. Victory in 1929 came courtesy of eight successive stage wins. At the height of his dominance, Binda was called to the head office of La Gazzetta dello Sport in 1930; the newspaper accused him of ruining the race and offered him 22,000 lira to be less dominant, which he refused. Binda won five Giros before he was usurped as the dominant cyclist by Gino Bartali. Nicknamed the "Iron Man of Tuscany" for his endurance, Bartali won two Giros during the 1930s, in 1936 and 1937. Bartali's dominance was challenged in 1940, the last Giro before the Second World War, when he was defeated by his 20-year-old teammate Fausto Coppi.

The rivalry between Bartali and Coppi intensified after the war. Bartali won his last Giro in 1946, with Coppi winning his second the following year. Coppi won a further three Giros and in 1952 he became the first cyclist to win the Tour de France and Giro in the same year. Swiss Hugo Koblet became the first non-Italian to win the race in 1950. No one dominated the tour during the 1950s, Coppi, Charly Gaul and Fiorenzo Magni each won two Giros during the decade. The 1960s were similar, five-time Tour de France winner Jacques Anquetil won in 1960, and 1964, while Franco Balmamion won successive Giros in 1962 and 1963.

Belgian Eddy Merckx was the dominant figure during the 1970s. His first victory came in 1968; another triumph in 1970 was followed by three successive victories from 1972 to 1974, which is the record for the most successive victories in the Giro. Felice Gimondi was victorious in 1976 winning his third Giro. Belgians Michel Pollentier and Johan De Muynck won the two subsequent Giros in 1977 and 1978. In 1980, Frenchman Bernard Hinault, who up to this point had won two Tours de France, became France's first winner since Anquetil in 1964. He would win another two Giros in 1982 and 1985.

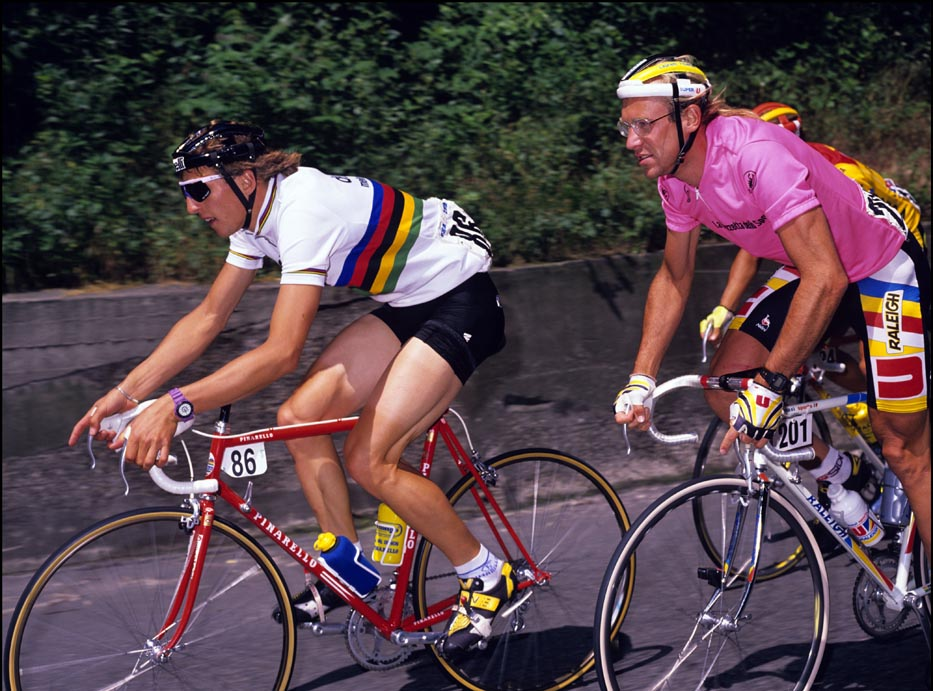
Laurent Fignon (right) in the pink jersey riding alongside World Champion Maurizio Fondriest at the 1989 Giro d'Italia.

Stephen Roche was victorious in 1987, a year in which he also won the Tour and the UCI Road World Championship. American Andrew Hampsten became the first non-European winner the following year, and Laurent Fignon was victorious in 1989. Spaniard Miguel Indurain, winner of five Tours, won successive Giros in 1991 and 1992. Three-time winner of the Vuelta a España, Tony Rominger was victorious in 1995, defeating the previous winner Evgeni Berzin. Marco Pantani was the winner in 1998, a year in which he completed the Tour and Giro double, Ivan Gotti won the previous Giro in 1997 and the subsequent one in 1999.

Stefano Garzelli won the Giro in 2000. Gilberto Simoni was the winner in 2001 and 2003, with Paolo Savoldelli victorious in 2002. Simoni was denied a third victory in 2004, when he was beaten by teammate Damiano Cunego. Salvodelli won his second Giro in 2005, beating Simoni by 28 seconds. Ivan Basso was the victor in 2006, Danilo di Luca won in 2007, though the tour was marred by doping allegations. Spaniard Alberto Contador of Astana was the winner in 2008; the following year he raced in the Tour de France instead, and Denis Menchov was the Giro victor. Basso returned after a doping suspension to regain his title in 2010. Contador was the victor at the podium ceremony in Milan, but he was later stripped of the title after he was found guilty of doping in the 2010 Tour de France. Runner-up Michele Scarponi was awarded the victory.

Ryder Hesjedal became the first Canadian to win the Giro in 2012, beating Joaquim Rodríguez by 16 seconds. After gaining the lead after the eighth stage, Vincenzo Nibali won two more stages to help consolidate his lead and win the 2013 edition. Colombian Nairo Quintana became the first rider from South America to win the Giro in 2014. The following year Contador won the Giro for the second time. Nibali won his second Giro in 2016; he finished 52 seconds ahead of second-placed Esteban Chaves. In 2017, Tom Dumoulin became the first Dutchman to win the Giro, finishing only 31 seconds ahead of Quintana. A year later, Chris Froome won the 2018 Giro, becoming the first British rider to win the race. He finished 46 seconds ahead of defending champion Dumoulin, mounting a comeback in the final week which included an 80 kilometres (50 mi) solo victory on stage 19. Richard Carapaz became the first Ecuadorian to win a Grand Tour when he won in 2019. British rider, Tao Geoghegan Hart, was the winner of the 2020 Giro. He won the race by 39 seconds after entering the final stage of the race, a time trial, level with runner-up, Jai Hindley. Egan Bernal won the 2021 Giro, while Hindley won the race a year later to become the first Australian rider to win the Giro. Primož Roglič became the first Slovenian to win the Giro in 2023 when he beat Geraint Thomas by 14 seconds. His compatriot, Tadej Pogačar, won the Giro the following year. Simon Yates won the Giro in 2025, winning the race by 3 minutes and 56 seconds from second-placed rider, Isaac del Toro. Jonas Vingegaard won the 2026 Giro, to become the eighth cyclist to win all three Grand Tours.

== Winners ==
Key
| † | Winner won points classification in the same year |
| * | Winner won mountains classification in the same year |
| # | Winner won young rider classification in the same year |
| ‡ | Winner won points and mountains classification in the same year |

- The "Year" column refers to the year the competition was held, and wikilinks to the article about that season.
- The "Distance" column refers to the distance over which the race was held.
- The "Margin" column refers to the margin of time or points by which the winner defeated the runner-up.
- The "Stage wins" column refers to the number of stage wins the winner had during the race.

Giro d'Italia general classification winners
| Year | Country | Cyclist | Sponsor / team | Distance | Time / points | Margin | Stage wins |
|---|---|---|---|---|---|---|---|
| 1909 | Italy | Luigi Ganna | Atala–Dunlop | 2,445 km (1,519 mi) | 25 | 2 | 3 |
| 1910 | Italy | Carlo Galetti | Atala–Continental | 2,984 km (1,854 mi) | 28 | 18 | 2 |
| 1911 | Italy | Carlo Galetti | Bianchi | 3,526 km (2,191 mi) | 50 | 8 | 3 |
| 1912 | Italy | — | Atala–Dunlop | 2,443 km (1,518 mi) | 33 | 10 | 1 |
| 1913 | Italy | Carlo Oriani | Maino | 2,932 km (1,822 mi) | 37 | 6 | 0 |
| 1914 | Italy | Alfonso Calzolari | Stucchi–Dunlop | 3,162 km (1,965 mi) | 135h 17' 56" | + 1h 57' 26" | 1 |
| 1915 | — | Not contested due to World War I | — | — | — | — | — |
| 1916 | — | Not contested due to World War I | — | — | — | — | — |
| 1917 | — | Not contested due to World War I | — | — | — | — | — |
| 1918 | — | Not contested due to World War I | — | — | — | — | — |
| 1919 | Italy | Costante Girardengo | Stucchi–Dunlop | 2,984 km (1,854 mi) | 112h 51' 29" | + 51' 56" | 7 |
| 1920 | Italy | Gaetano Belloni | Bianchi | 2,632 km (1,635 mi) | 102h 44' 33" | + 32' 24" | 3 |
| 1921 | Italy | Giovanni Brunero | Legnano–Pirelli | 3,107 km (1,931 mi) | 120h 24' 39" | + 41" | 1 |
| 1922 | Italy | Giovanni Brunero | Legnano–Pirelli | 3,095 km (1,923 mi) | 119h 43' 00" | + 12' 29" | 2 |
| 1923 | Italy | Costante Girardengo | Maino | 3,202 km (1,990 mi) | 122h 28' 17" | + 37" | 8 |
| 1924 | Italy | Giuseppe Enrici | — | 3,613 km (2,245 mi) | 143h 43' 37" | + 58' 21" | 2 |
| 1925 | Italy | Alfredo Binda | Legnano–Pirelli | 3,520 km (2,190 mi) | 137h 31' 13" | + 4' 58" | 1 |
| 1926 | Italy | Giovanni Brunero | Legnano–Pirelli | 3,430 km (2,130 mi) | 137h 55' 59" | + 15' 28" | 1 |
| 1927 | Italy | Alfredo Binda | Legnano–Pirelli | 3,758 km (2,335 mi) | 144h 15' 35" | + 27' 24" | 12 |
| 1928 | Italy | Alfredo Binda | Wolsit–Pirelli | 3,044 km (1,891 mi) | 114h 15' 19" | + 18' 13" | 6 |
| 1929 | Italy | Alfredo Binda | Legnano–Torpedo | 2,920 km (1,810 mi) | 107h 18' 24" | + 3' 44" | 8 |
| 1930 | Italy | Luigi Marchisio | Legnano–Pirelli | 3,095 km (1,923 mi) | 115h 11' 55" | + 52" | 2 |
| 1931 | Italy | Francesco Camusso | Gloria–Hutchinson | 3,012 km (1,872 mi) | 102h 40' 46" | + 2' 47" | 2 |
| 1932 | Italy | Antonio Pesenti | Wolsit–Hutchinson | 3,235 km (2,010 mi) | 105h 42' 41" | + 11' 09" | 1 |
| 1933 | Italy | Alfredo Binda^{*} | Legnano–Clément | 3,343 km (2,077 mi) | 111h 01' 52" | + 12' 34" | 6 |
| 1934 | Italy | Learco Guerra | Maino–Clément | 3,706 km (2,303 mi) | 121h 17' 17" | + 51" | 10 |
| 1935 | Italy | Vasco Bergamaschi | Maino–Girardengo | 3,577 km (2,223 mi) | 113h 22' 46" | + 3' 07" | 2 |
| 1936 | Italy | Gino Bartali^{*} | Legnano–Wolsit | 3,766 km (2,340 mi) | 120h 12' 30" | + 2' 36" | 3 |
| 1937 | Italy | Gino Bartali^{*} | Legnano | 3,840 km (2,390 mi) | 122h 25' 40" | + 8' 18" | 4 |
| 1938 | Italy | Giovanni Valetti^{*} | Fréjus | 3,645 km (2,265 mi) | 112h 49' 28" | + 8' 52" | 3 |
| 1939 | Italy | Giovanni Valetti | Fréjus | 3,011 km (1,871 mi) | 88h 02' 00" | + 2' 59" | 3 |
| 1940 | Italy | Fausto Coppi | Legnano | 3,574 km (2,221 mi) | 107h 31' 10" | + 2' 40" | 1 |
| 1941 | — | Not contested due to World War II | — | — | — | — | — |
| 1942 | — | Not contested due to World War II | — | — | — | — | — |
| 1943 | — | Not contested due to World War II | — | — | — | — | — |
| 1944 | — | Not contested due to World War II | — | — | — | — | — |
| 1945 | — | Not contested due to World War II | — | — | — | — | — |
| 1946 | Italy | Gino Bartali^{*} | Legnano–Pirelli | 3,039 km (1,888 mi) | 95h 32' 20" | + 47" | 0 |
| 1947 | Italy | Fausto Coppi | Bianchi | 3,843 km (2,388 mi) | 115h 55' 07" | + 1' 43" | 3 |
| 1948 | Italy | Fiorenzo Magni | Wilier Triestina | 4,164 km (2,587 mi) | 125h 51' 52" | + 11" | 3 |
| 1949 | Italy | Fausto Coppi^{*} | Bianchi–Ursus | 4,088 km (2,540 mi) | 125h 25' 50" | + 23' 47" | 3 |
| 1950 | Switzerland | Hugo Koblet^{*} | Guerra–Ursus | 3,981 km (2,474 mi) | 117h 28' 03" | + 5' 12" | 2 |
| 1951 | Italy | Fiorenzo Magni | Ganna–Ursus | 4,153 km (2,581 mi) | 121h 11' 37" | + 1' 46" | 0 |
| 1952 | Italy | Fausto Coppi | Bianchi–Pirelli | 3,964 km (2,463 mi) | 114h 36' 43" | + 9' 18" | 3 |
| 1953 | Italy | Fausto Coppi | Bianchi–Pirelli | 4,035 km (2,507 mi) | 118h 37' 26" | + 1' 29" | 3 |
| 1954 | Switzerland | Carlo Clerici | Guerra–Ursus | 4,337 km (2,695 mi) | 129h 13' 07" | + 24' 16" | 1 |
| 1955 | Italy | Fiorenzo Magni | Clément–Fuchs | 3,861 km (2,399 mi) | 108h 56' 13" | + 13" | 1 |
| 1956 | Luxembourg | Charly Gaul^{*} | Faema–Guerra | 3,523 km (2,189 mi) | 101h 39' 49" | + 3' 27" | 3 |
| 1957 | Italy | Gastone Nencini | Leo–Chlorodont | 3,926 km (2,440 mi) | 104h 45' 06" | + 19" | 2 |
| 1958 | Italy | Ercole Baldini | Legnano | 3,341 km (2,076 mi) | 92h 09' 30" | + 4' 17" | 4 |
| 1959 | Luxembourg | Charly Gaul^{*} | EMI | 3,657 km (2,272 mi) | 101h 50' 54" | + 6' 12" | 3 |
| 1960 | France | Jacques Anquetil | Fynsec–Helyett | 3,481 km (2,163 mi) | 94h 03' 54" | + 28" | 2 |
| 1961 | Italy | Arnaldo Pambianco | Fides | 4,004 km (2,488 mi) | 111h 25' 28" | + 3' 45" | 0 |
| 1962 | Italy | Franco Balmamion | Carpano | 4,180 km (2,600 mi) | 123h 07' 03" | + 3' 57" | 0 |
| 1963 | Italy | Franco Balmamion | Carpano | 4,063 km (2,525 mi) | 116h 50' 16" | + 2' 24" | 0 |
| 1964 | France | Jacques Anquetil | Saint-Raphaël–Gitane–Dunlop | 4,069 km (2,528 mi) | 115h 10' 27" | + 1' 22" | 1 |
| 1965 | Italy | Vittorio Adorni | Salvarani | 4,051 km (2,517 mi) | 121h 08' 18" | + 11' 26" | 3 |
| 1966 | Italy | Gianni Motta^{†} | Molteni | 3,976 km (2,471 mi) | 111h 10' 48" | + 3' 57" | 2 |
| 1967 | Italy | Felice Gimondi | Salvarani | 3,572 km (2,220 mi) | 101h 05' 34" | + 3' 36" | 1 |
| 1968 | Belgium | Eddy Merckx^{‡} | Faema | 3,917 km (2,434 mi) | 108h 42' 27" | + 5' 01" | 3 |
| 1969 | Italy | Felice Gimondi | Salvarani | 3,851 km (2,393 mi) | 128h 04' 27" | + 3' 35" | 0 |
| 1970 | Belgium | Eddy Merckx | Faemino–Faema | 3,292 km (2,046 mi) | 90h 08' 47" | + 3' 14" | 3 |
| 1971 | Sweden | Gösta Pettersson | Ferretti | 3,621 km (2,250 mi) | 97h 24' 04" | + 2' 32" | 0 |
| 1972 | Belgium | Eddy Merckx | Molteni | 3,725 km (2,315 mi) | 103h 04' 04" | + 5' 30" | 3 |
| 1973 | Belgium | Eddy Merckx^{†} | Molteni | 3,801 km (2,362 mi) | 106h 54' 41" | + 7' 42" | 6 |
| 1974 | Belgium | Eddy Merckx | Molteni | 4,001 km (2,486 mi) | 113h 08' 13" | + 12" | 2 |
| 1975 | Italy | Fausto Bertoglio | Jollj Ceramica | 3,933 km (2,444 mi) | 111h 31' 24" | + 41" | 1 |
| 1976 | Italy | Felice Gimondi | Bianchi–Campagnolo | 4,161 km (2,586 mi) | 119h 58' 16" | + 19" | 1 |
| 1977 | Belgium | Michel Pollentier | Flandria–Velda–Latina Assicurazioni | 3,884 km (2,413 mi) | 107h 27' 16" | + 2' 32" | 1 |
| 1978 | Belgium | Johan De Muynck | Bianchi–Faema | 3,610 km (2,240 mi) | 101h 31' 22" | + 59" | 1 |
| 1979 | Italy | Giuseppe Saronni^{†} | Scic–Bottecchia | 3,301 km (2,051 mi) | 89h 29' 18" | + 2' 09" | 3 |
| 1980 | France | Bernard Hinault | Renault–Gitane | 4,025 km (2,501 mi) | 112h 08' 20" | + 5' 43" | 1 |
| 1981 | Italy | Giovanni Battaglin | Inoxpran | 3,895 km (2,420 mi) | 104h 50' 36" | + 38" | 1 |
| 1982 | France | Bernard Hinault | Renault–Elf–Gitane | 4,010 km (2,490 mi) | 110h 07' 55" | + 2' 35" | 4 |
| 1983 | Italy | Giuseppe Saronni^{†} | Del Tongo–Colnago | 3,916 km (2,433 mi) | 100h 45' 30" | + 1' 07" | 3 |
| 1984 | Italy | Francesco Moser | Gis Gelati–Tuc Lu | 3,808 km (2,366 mi) | 98h 32' 20" | + 1' 03" | 4 |
| 1985 | France | Bernard Hinault | La Vie Claire–Look | 3,998 km (2,484 mi) | 105h 46' 51" | + 1' 08" | 1 |
| 1986 | Italy | Roberto Visentini | Carrera Jeans–Vagabond | 3,858 km (2,397 mi) | 102h 33' 55" | + 1' 02" | 1 |
| 1987 | Ireland | Stephen Roche | Carrera Jeans–Vagabond | 3,915 km (2,433 mi) | 105h 39' 42" | + 3' 40" | 2 |
| 1988 | United States | Andrew Hampsten^{*} | 7-Eleven–Hoonved | 3,759 km (2,336 mi) | 97h 18' 56" | + 1' 43" | 2 |
| 1989 | France | Laurent Fignon | Super U–Raleigh–Fiat | 3,623 km (2,251 mi) | 93h 30' 16" | + 1' 15" | 1 |
| 1990 | Italy | Gianni Bugno^{†} | Chateau d'Ax–Salotti | 3,450 km (2,140 mi) | 91h 51' 04" | + 6' 33" | 3 |
| 1991 | Italy | Franco Chioccioli | Del Tongo–MG Boys | 3,715 km (2,308 mi) | 99h 35' 43" | + 3' 48" | 3 |
| 1992 | Spain | Miguel Indurain | Banesto | 3,835 km (2,383 mi) | 103h 36' 08" | + 5' 12" | 2 |
| 1993 | Spain | Miguel Indurain | Banesto | 3,703 km (2,301 mi) | 99h 09' 44" | + 58" | 2 |
| 1994 | Russia | Evgeni Berzin^{#} | Gewiss–Ballan | 3,738 km (2,323 mi) | 100h 41' 21" | + 2' 51" | 3 |
| 1995 | Switzerland | Tony Rominger^{†} | Mapei–GB–Latexco | 3,736 km (2,321 mi) | 97h 37' 50" | + 4' 13" | 4 |
| 1996 | Russia | Pavel Tonkov | Panaria–Vinavil | 3,990 km (2,480 mi) | 105h 20' 23" | + 2' 43" | 1 |
| 1997 | Italy | Ivan Gotti | Saeco–Estro | 3,912 km (2,431 mi) | 102h 53' 58" | + 1' 27" | 1 |
| 1998 | Italy | Marco Pantani^{*} | Mercatone Uno–Bianchi | 3,868 km (2,403 mi) | 98h 48' 32" | + 1' 43" | 2 |
| 1999 | Italy | Ivan Gotti | Team Polti | 3,757 km (2,334 mi) | 99h 55' 56" | + 3' 35" | 0 |
| 2000 | Italy | Stefano Garzelli | Mercatone Uno–Albacom | 3,707 km (2,303 mi) | 98h 30' 14" | + 1' 27" | 1 |
| 2001 | Italy | Gilberto Simoni | Lampre–Daikin | 3,572 km (2,220 mi) | 89h 02' 58" | + 7' 31" | 1 |
| 2002 | Italy | Paolo Savoldelli | Index–Alexia Alluminio | 3,334 km (2,072 mi) | 89h 22' 42" | + 1' 41" | 0 |
| 2003 | Italy | Gilberto Simoni^{†} | Saeco | 3,544 km (2,202 mi) | 89h 32' 09" | + 7' 06" | 3 |
| 2004 | Italy | Damiano Cunego | Saeco | 3,435 km (2,134 mi) | 88h 40' 43" | + 2' 02" | 4 |
| 2005 | Italy | Paolo Savoldelli | Discovery Channel | 3,440 km (2,140 mi) | 91h 25' 51" | + 28" | 1 |
| 2006 | Italy | Ivan Basso | Team CSC | 3,526 km (2,191 mi) | 91h 33' 36" | + 9' 18" | 3 |
| 2007 | Italy | Danilo Di Luca | Liquigas | 3,463 km (2,152 mi) | 92h 59' 39" | + 1' 55" | 2 |
| 2008 | Spain | Alberto Contador | Astana | 3,420 km (2,130 mi) | 89h 56' 49" | + 1' 57" | 0 |
| 2009 | Russia | Denis Menchov^{†} | Rabobank | 3,456 km (2,147 mi) | 86h 03' 11" | + 41" | 3 |
| 2010 | Italy | Ivan Basso | Liquigas–Doimo | 3,485 km (2,165 mi) | 87h 44' 01" | + 1' 51" | 1 |
| 2011 | Italy | Michele Scarponi^{†} (Note: Alberto Contador was the winner at the podium ceremony in Milan on the last day of the 2011 Giro d'Italia, but was subsequently found to have tested positive for performing-enhancing drugs on a rest day in the 2010 Tour de France. He was originally suspended on 25 January 2011 for a year, but appealed the decision. The Court of Arbitration for Sport found him guilty of using clenbuterol during the race; thus his results since the 2010 Tour de France were taken away from him and he was stripped of the win on 6 February 2012.) | Lampre–ISD | 3,524 km (2,190 mi) | 84h 11' 24" | + 46" | 0 |
| 2012 | Canada | Ryder Hesjedal | Garmin–Barracuda | 3,503 km (2,177 mi) | 91h 39' 02" | + 16" | 0 |
| 2013 | Italy | Vincenzo Nibali | Astana | 3,405 km (2,116 mi) | 84h 53' 28" | + 4' 43" | 2 |
| 2014 | Colombia | Nairo Quintana^{#} | Movistar Team | 3,445.5 km (2,140.9 mi) | 88h 14' 32" | + 2' 58" | 2 |
| 2015 | Spain | Alberto Contador | Tinkoff–Saxo | 3,481.8 km (2,163.5 mi) | 88h 22' 25" | + 1' 53" | 0 |
| 2016 | Italy | Vincenzo Nibali | Astana | 3,463.15 km (2,151.90 mi) | 82h 44' 31" | +52" | 1 |
| 2017 | Netherlands | Tom Dumoulin | Team Sunweb | 3,609.1 km (2,242.6 mi) | 90h 44' 54" | +31" | 2 |
| 2018 | Great Britain | Chris Froome^{*} | Team Sky | 3,572.4 km (2,219.8 mi) | 89h 02' 39" | +46" | 2 |
| 2019 | Ecuador | Richard Carapaz | Movistar Team | 3,546.8 km (2,203.9 mi) | 90h 01' 47" | +1' 05" | 2 |
| 2020 | Great Britain | Tao Geoghegan Hart^{#} | INEOS Grenadiers | 3,361.4 km (2,088.7 mi) | 85h 40' 21" | +39" | 2 |
| 2021 | Colombia | Egan Bernal^{#} | INEOS Grenadiers | 3,410.9 km (2,119.4 mi) | 86h 17' 28" | +1' 29" | 2 |
| 2022 | Australia | Jai Hindley | Bora–Hansgrohe | 3,445.6 km (2,141.0 mi) | 86h 31' 14" | +1' 17" | 1 |
| 2023 | Slovenia | Primož Roglič | Team Jumbo–Visma | 3,448 km (2,142 mi) | 85h 29' 02" | +14" | 1 |
| 2024 | Slovenia | Tadej Pogačar^{*} | UAE Team Emirates | 3,317.5 km (2,061.4 mi) | 79h 14' 03" | +9' 56" | 6 |
| 2025 | Great Britain | Simon Yates | Visma–Lease a Bike | 3,443.3 km (2,139.6 mi) | 82h 31' 01" | +3' 56" | 0 |
| 2026 | Denmark | Jonas Vingegaard | Visma–Lease a Bike | 3,459.2 km (2,149.4 mi) | 83h 22' 51" | +5' 22" | 5 |

=== Multiple winners ===
As of 2022, 22 cyclists have won the Giro d'Italia more than once.

| Cyclist | Total | Years |
|---|---|---|
| Alfredo Binda (ITA) | 5 | 1925, 1927, 1928, 1929, 1933 |
| Fausto Coppi (ITA) | 5 | 1940, 1947, 1949, 1952, 1953 |
| Eddy Merckx (BEL) | 5 | 1968, 1970, 1972, 1973, 1974 |
| Giovanni Brunero (ITA) | 3 | 1921, 1922, 1926 |
| Gino Bartali (ITA) | 3 | 1936, 1937, 1946 |
| Fiorenzo Magni (ITA) | 3 | 1948, 1951, 1955 |
| Felice Gimondi (ITA) | 3 | 1967, 1969, 1976 |
| Bernard Hinault (FRA) | 3 | 1980, 1982, 1985 |
| (Italy) Carlo Galetti | 2 | 1910, 1911 |
| (Italy) Costante Girardengo | 2 | 1919, 1923 |
| Giovanni Valetti (ITA) | 2 | 1938, 1939 |
| Charly Gaul (LUX) | 2 | 1956, 1959 |
| Franco Balmamion (ITA) | 2 | 1962, 1963 |
| Jacques Anquetil (FRA) | 2 | 1960, 1964 |
| Giuseppe Saronni (ITA) | 2 | 1979, 1983 |
| Miguel Indurain (ESP) | 2 | 1992, 1993 |
| Ivan Gotti (ITA) | 2 | 1997, 1999 |
| Gilberto Simoni (ITA) | 2 | 2001, 2003 |
| Paolo Savoldelli (ITA) | 2 | 2002, 2005 |
| Ivan Basso (ITA) | 2 | 2006, 2010 |
| Alberto Contador (ESP) | 2 | 2008, 2015 |
| Vincenzo Nibali (ITA) | 2 | 2013, 2016 |

=== Wins per country ===
Riders from seventeen countries have won the Giro d'Italia.

Giro d'Italia general classification wins per country
| Country | Winning cyclists | Wins |
|---|---|---|
| Italy | 44 | 69 |
| Belgium | 3 | 7 |
| France | 3 | 6 |
| Spain | 2 | 4 |
| Switzerland | 3 | 3 |
| Russia | 3 | 3 |
| Great Britain | 3 | 3 |
| Colombia | 2 | 2 |
| Slovenia | 2 | 2 |
| Luxembourg | 1 | 2 |
| Sweden | 1 | 1 |
| Ireland | 1 | 1 |
| United States | 1 | 1 |
| Canada | 1 | 1 |
| Netherlands | 1 | 1 |
| Ecuador | 1 | 1 |
| Australia | 1 | 1 |
| Denmark | 1 | 1 |

== Bibliography ==
- Foot, John (2011). Pedalare! Pedalare! A History of Italian Cycling. Bloomsbury. ISBN 978-1-4088-2219-7.
- Fotheringham, William (2010). Fallen Angel: The Passion of Fausto Coppi. Yellow Press. ISBN 978-0-224-07450-6.
- Sykes, Herbie (2008). The Eagle of the Canavese: Franco Balmamion and the Giro d'Italia. Mousehold Press. ISBN 978-1-874739-49-4.
- van Walleghem, Rik (1993). Eddy Merckx: The Greatest Cyclist of the 20th century. Penguin Productions. ISBN 978-1-884737-72-5.
