= List of Giro d'Italia starts =

The Giro d'Italia is an annual road bicycle race held over 23 days in May and June. Established in 1909 by newspaper La Gazzetta dello Sport, the Giro is the second-most well-known and prestigious of cycling's three "Grand Tours"; the others are the Tour de France and the Vuelta a España. The race usually covers approximately 3,500 kilometres (2,200 mi), passing through Italy and neighboring countries such as France and Switzerland. The race is broken into day-long segments, called stages. Individual finishing times for each stage are totaled to determine the overall winner at the end of the race.

== Host cities ==
Giro d'Italia Grande Partenza hosts
Year	Country	Region	Grande Partenza host	Winning rider
1909	Italy	Lombardy	Milan (Piazzale Loreto)	Luigi Ganna (ITA)
1910	Italy	Lombardy	Milan	Carlo Galetti (ITA)
1911	Italy	Lazio	Rome	Carlo Galetti (ITA)
1912	Italy	Lombardy	Milan	Atala–Dunlop (Note: The 1912 Giro d'Italia changed from an individual race to a team–based general classification for one year.)
1913	Italy	Lombardy	Milan	Carlo Oriani (ITA)
1914	Italy	Lombardy	Milan	Alfonso Calzolari (ITA)
1915	—	—	—	—
1916	—	—	—	—
1917	—	—	—	—
1918	—	—	—	—
1919	Italy	Lombardy	Milan	Costante Girardengo (ITA)
1920	Italy	Lombardy	Milan	Gaetano Belloni (ITA)
1921	Italy	Lombardy	Milan	Giovanni Brunero (ITA)
1922	Italy	Lombardy	Milan	Giovanni Brunero (ITA)
1923	Italy	Lombardy	Milan	Costante Girardengo (ITA)
1924	Italy	Lombardy	Milan	Giuseppe Enrici (ITA)
1925	Italy	Lombardy	Milan	Alfredo Binda (ITA)
1926	Italy	Lombardy	Milan	Giovanni Brunero (ITA)
1927	Italy	Lombardy	Milan	Alfredo Binda (ITA)
1928	Italy	Lombardy	Milan	Alfredo Binda (ITA)
1929	Italy	Lazio	Rome	Alfredo Binda (ITA)
1930	Italy	Sicily	Messina	Luigi Marchisio (ITA)
1931	Italy	Lombardy	Milan	Francesco Camusso (ITA)
1932	Italy	Lombardy	Milan	Antonio Pesenti (ITA)
1933	Italy	Lombardy	Milan	Alfredo Binda (ITA)
1934	Italy	Lombardy	Milan	Learco Guerra (ITA)
1935	Italy	Lombardy	Milan	Vasco Bergamaschi (ITA)
1936	Italy	Lombardy	Milan	Gino Bartali (ITA)
1937	Italy	Lombardy	Milan	Gino Bartali (ITA)
1938	Italy	Lombardy	Milan	Giovanni Valetti (ITA)
1939	Italy	Lombardy	Milan	Giovanni Valetti (ITA)
1940	Italy	Lombardy	Milan	Fausto Coppi (ITA)
1941	—	—	—	—
1942	—	—	—	—
1943	—	—	—	—
1944	—	—	—	—
1945	—	—	—	—
1946	Italy	Lombardy	Milan	Gino Bartali (ITA)
1947	Italy	Lombardy	Milan	Fausto Coppi (ITA)
1948	Italy	Lombardy	Milan	Fiorenzo Magni (ITA)
1949	Italy	Sicily	Palermo	Fausto Coppi (ITA)
1950	Italy	Lombardy	Milan	Hugo Koblet (SUI)
1951	Italy	Lombardy	Milan	Fiorenzo Magni (ITA)
1952	Italy	Lombardy	Milan	Fausto Coppi (ITA)
1953	Italy	Lombardy	Milan	Fausto Coppi (ITA)
1954	Italy	Sicily	Palermo	Carlo Clerici (SUI)
1955	Italy	Lombardy	Milan	Fiorenzo Magni (ITA)
1956	Italy	Lombardy	Milan	Charly Gaul (LUX)
1957	Italy	Lombardy	Milan	Gastone Nencini (FRA)
1958	Italy	Lombardy	Milan	Ercole Baldini (ITA)
1959	Italy	Lombardy	Milan	Charly Gaul (LUX)
1960	Italy	Lazio	Rome	Jacques Anquetil (FRA)
1961	Italy	Piedmont	Turin	Arnaldo Pambianco (ITA)
1962	Italy	Lombardy	Milan	Franco Balmamion (ITA)
1963	Italy	Campania	Naples	Franco Balmamion (ITA)
1964	Italy	Trentino-Alto Adige/Südtirol	Bolzano	Jacques Anquetil (FRA)
1965	San Marino	San Marino	City of San Marino	Vittorio Adorni (ITA)
1966	Monaco	Monaco	Monte Carlo	Gianni Motta (ITA)
1967	Italy	Lombardy	Treviglio	Felice Gimondi (ITA)
1968	Italy	Lombardy	Campione d'Italia	Eddy Merckx (BEL)
1969	Italy	Veneto	Garda	Felice Gimondi (ITA)
1970	Italy	Lombardy	San Pellegrino Terme	Eddy Merckx (BEL)
1971	Italy	Apulia	Lecce	Gösta Pettersson (SWE)
1972	Italy	Veneto	Venice	Eddy Merckx (BEL)
1973	Belgium	Wallonia	Verviers	Eddy Merckx (BEL)
1974	Vatican City	Vatican City	Vatican City	Eddy Merckx (BEL)
1975	Italy	Lombardy	Milan	Fausto Bertoglio (ITA)
1976	Italy	Sicily	Catania	Felice Gimondi (ITA)
1977	Italy	Campania	Bacoli	Michel Pollentier (BEL)
1978	Italy	Aosta Valley	Saint-Vincent	Johan De Muynck (BEL)
1979	Italy	Tuscany	Florence	Giuseppe Saronni (ITA)
1980	Italy	Liguria	Genoa	Bernard Hinault (FRA)
1981	Italy	Friuli-Venezia Giulia	Trieste	Giovanni Battaglin (ITA)
1982	Italy	Lombardy	Milan	Bernard Hinault (FRA)
1983	Italy	Lombardy	Brescia	Giuseppe Saronni (ITA)
1984	Italy	Tuscany	Lucca	Francesco Moser (ITA)
1985	Italy	Veneto	Verona	Bernard Hinault (FRA)
1986	Italy	Sicily	Palermo	Roberto Visentini (ITA)
1987	Italy	Liguria	San Remo	Stephen Roche (IRL)
1988	Italy	Marche	Urbino	Andrew Hampsten (USA)
1989	Italy	Sicily	Taormina	Laurent Fignon (FRA)
1990	Italy	Apulia	Bari	Gianni Bugno (ITA)
1991	Italy	Sardinia	Olbia	Franco Chioccioli (ITA)
1992	Italy	Liguria	Genoa	Miguel Indurain (ESP)
1993	Italy	Tuscany	Porto Azzurro	Miguel Indurain (ESP)
1994	Italy	Emilia-Romagna	Bologna	Evgeni Berzin (RUS)
1995	Italy	Umbria	Perugia	Tony Rominger (SUI)
1996	Greece	Attica	Athens	Pavel Tonkov (RUS)
1997	Italy	Veneto	Venice	Ivan Gotti (ITA)
1998	France	Provence-Alpes-Côte d'Azur	Nice	Marco Pantani (ITA)
1999	Italy	Sicily	Agrigento	Ivan Gotti (ITA)
2000	Italy	Lazio	Rome	Stefano Garzelli (ITA)
2001	Italy	Abruzzo	Montesilvano	Gilberto Simoni (ITA)
2002	Netherlands	(Groningen (province)) Groningen	Groningen	Paolo Savoldelli (ITA)
2003	Italy	Apulia	Lecce	Gilberto Simoni (ITA)
2004	Italy	Liguria	Genoa	Damiano Cunego (ITA)
2005	Italy	Calabria	Reggio Calabria	Paolo Savoldelli (ITA)
2006	Belgium	Wallonia	Seraing	Ivan Basso (ITA)
2007	Italy	Sardinia	Caprera	Danilo Di Luca (ITA)
2008	Italy	Sicily	Palermo	Alberto Contador (ESP)
2009	Italy	Veneto	Lido di Venezia	Denis Menchov (RUS)
2010	Netherlands	North Holland	Amsterdam	Ivan Basso (ITA)
2011	Italy	Piedmont	Venaria Reale	Michele Scarponi (ITA) (Note: Alberto Contador was the winner at the podium ceremony in Milan on the last day of the 2011 Giro d'Italia, but was subsequently found to have tested positive for performing-enhancing drugs on a rest day in the 2010 Tour de France. He was originally suspended on 25 January 2011 for a year, but appealed the decision. The Court of Arbitration for Sport found him guilty of using clenbuterol during the race; thus his results since the 2010 Tour de France were taken away from him and he was stripped of the win on 6 February 2012.)
2012	Denmark	(Central Denmark Region) Mid Jutland (Midtjylland)	Herning	Ryder Hesjedal (CAN)
2013	Italy	Campania	Naples	Vincenzo Nibali (ITA)
2014	United Kingdom	Northern Ireland	Belfast	Nairo Quintana (COL)
2015	Italy	Liguria	San Lorenzo al Mare	Alberto Contador (ESP)
2016	Netherlands	Gelderland	Apeldoorn	Vincenzo Nibali (ITA)
2017	Italy	Sardinia	Alghero	Tom Dumoulin (NED)
2018	Israel	Jerusalem District	Jerusalem	Chris Froome (GBR)
2019	Italy	Emilia-Romagna	Bologna	Richard Carapaz (ECU)
2020	Italy	Sicily	Monreale (Note: Budapest, Hungary was scheduled to host the Grande Partenza for the 2020 Giro d'Italia. It was the first time a Grand Tour was going to enter the country. However, due to the COVID-19 pandemic that started in 2019 and spanned into 2020, the Giro cancelled the start in Hungary and the race itself and race organizer RCS Sport stated they would later announce new plans for the 2020 Giro. On 5 May, RCS announced that Hungary would not host any stages and the new start would take place somewhere in southern Italy.)	Tao Geoghegan Hart (GBR)
2021	Italy	Piedmont	Turin	Egan Bernal (COL)
2022	Hungary	Central Hungary	Budapest	Jai Hindley (AUS)
2023	Italy	Abruzzo	Fossacesia	Primož Roglič (SLO)
2024	Italy	Piedmont	Venaria Reale	Tadej Pogacar (SLO)
2025	Albania	Durrës County	Durrës	Simon Yates (GBR)
2026	Bulgaria	Burgas Province	Nessebar	Jonas Vingegaard (DEN)

== Countries that have hosted Grande Partenza ==
Countries that have hosted Grande Partenza
No.	Country	Cities
3	Netherlands	Groningen, Amsterdam, Apeldoorn
2	Belgium	Verviers, Seraing
1	Greece	Athens
1	Vatican City	Vatican City
1	San Marino	San Marino
1	Monaco	Monte Carlo
1	Denmark	Herning
1	United Kingdom	Belfast
1	Israel	Jerusalem
1	Hungary	Budapest
1	Albania	Durrës
1	Bulgaria	Nessebar

== See also ==
- List of Giro d'Italia classification winners
- Pink jersey statistics
- List of Grand Tour general classification winners
