= 1929 Milan–San Remo =

Race details
- Dates: 19 March 1929
- Stages: 1
- Distance: 286.5 km (178.0 mi)
- Winning time: 9h 03' 30"

Results
	Winner	Alfredo Binda (ITA)
	Second	Leonida Frascarelli (ITA)
	Third	Pio Caimmi (ITA)

The 1929 Milan–San Remo was the 22nd edition of the Milan–San Remo cycle race and was held on 19 March 1929. The race started in Milan and finished in San Remo. The race was won by Alfredo Binda.

== General classification ==
Final general classification

Rank	Rider	Time
1	Alfredo Binda (ITA)	9h 03' 30"
2	Leonida Frascarelli (ITA)	+ 8' 30"
3	Pio Caimmi (ITA)	+ 21' 30"
4	Adriano Zanaga (ITA)	+ 21' 30"
5	Colombo Neri (ITA)	+ 21' 30"
6	Giuseppe Pancera (ITA)	+ 21' 30"
7	Alessandro Catalani (ITA)	+ 21' 30"
8	Michele Orecchia (ITA)	+ 21' 30"
9	Pietro Bestetti (ITA)	+ 24' 00"
10	Carlo Moretti (ITA)	+ 24' 00"
