= 1927 Giro di Lombardia =

Race details
- Dates: 30 October 1927
- Stages: 1
- Distance: 252 km (156.6 mi)
- Winning time: 8h 57' 27"

Results
	Winner	Alfredo Binda (ITA)
	Second	Alfonso Piccin (ITA)
	Third	Pietro Fossati (ITA)

The 1927 Giro di Lombardia was the 23rd edition of the Giro di Lombardia cycle race and was held on 30 October 1927. The race started and finished in Milan. The race was won by Alfredo Binda.

== General classification ==
Final general classification

Rank	Rider	Team	Time
1	Alfredo Binda (ITA)	Legnano-Pirelli	8h 57' 27"
2	Alfonso Piccin (ITA)	Christophe-Hutchinson	+ 4' 11"
3	Pietro Fossati (ITA)	Wolsit-Pirelli	+ 4' 11"
4	Giuseppe Pancera (ITA)	Berrettini-Hutchinson	+ 4' 12"
5	Luigi Giacobbe (ITA)	Wolsit-Pirelli	+ 4' 12"
6	Albert Blattmann (SUI)	Diamant	+ 4' 13"
7	Giovanni Brunero (ITA)	Legnano-Pirelli	+ 5' 57"
8	Alessandro Catalani (ITA)	Wolsit-Pirelli	+ 6' 21"
9	Michele Mara (ITA)		+ 8' 18"
10	Battista Visconti (ITA)		+ 13' 58"
