= List of Giro d'Italia classification winners =

The Giro d'Italia is one of cycling's three Grand Tours. A stage race that generally lasts for three weeks, it awards a number of jerseys for winners of certain classifications – the current competitions that award a jersey are:

- General classification, for the fastest rider to complete the race. The winner wears the maglia rosa (pink jersey).
- Points classification, for the rider with the most points as awarded by finishing positions on stages and the first riders to go through intermediate sprints. Recently, the winner wears the maglia rosso passione (red jersey). In 2017, the race organizers brought back the maglia ciclamino (cyclamen jersey).
- Mountains classification, for the rider awarded the most points for crossing designated climbs, generally at the peaks of hills and mountains. The winner wears the maglia azzurra (blue jersey).
- Young rider classification, for the fastest rider under the age of 25 to complete the race. The winner wears the maglia bianca (white jersey).

== General performances ==
Years	General classification	Points classification	Mountains classification	Young rider classification
1909	(Italy) Luigi Ganna	not awarded	not awarded	not awarded
1910	(Italy) Carlo Galetti	not awarded	not awarded	not awarded
1911	(Italy) Carlo Galetti	not awarded	not awarded	not awarded
1912	(Italy) Team Atala	not awarded	not awarded	not awarded
1913	(Italy) Carlo Oriani	not awarded	not awarded	not awarded
1914	(Italy) Alfonso Calzolari	not awarded	not awarded	not awarded
1915 to 1918: suspended because of World War I
1919	(Italy) Costante Girardengo	not awarded	not awarded	not awarded
1920	(Italy) Gaetano Belloni	not awarded	not awarded	not awarded
1921	(Italy) Giovanni Brunero	not awarded	not awarded	not awarded
1922	(Italy) Giovanni Brunero	not awarded	not awarded	not awarded
1923	(Italy) Costante Girardengo	not awarded	not awarded	not awarded
1924	(Italy) Giuseppe Enrici	not awarded	not awarded	not awarded
1925	(Italy) Alfredo Binda	not awarded	not awarded	not awarded
1926	(Italy) Giovanni Brunero	not awarded	not awarded	not awarded
1927	(Italy) Alfredo Binda	not awarded	not awarded	not awarded
1928	(Italy) Alfredo Binda	not awarded	not awarded	not awarded
1929	(Italy) Alfredo Binda	not awarded	not awarded	not awarded
1930	(Italy) Luigi Marchisio	not awarded	not awarded	not awarded
1931	(Italy) Francesco Camusso	not awarded	not awarded	not awarded
1932	(Italy) Antonio Pesenti	not awarded	not awarded	not awarded
1933	(Italy) Alfredo Binda	not awarded	(Italy) Alfredo Binda	not awarded
1934	(Italy) Learco Guerra	not awarded	(Italy) Remo Bertoni	not awarded
1935	(Italy) Vasco Bergamaschi	not awarded	(Italy) Gino Bartali	not awarded
1936	(Italy) Gino Bartali	not awarded	(Italy) Gino Bartali	not awarded
1937	(Italy) Gino Bartali	not awarded	(Italy) Gino Bartali	not awarded
1938	(Italy) Giovanni Valetti	not awarded	(Italy) Giovanni Valetti	not awarded
1939	(Italy) Giovanni Valetti	not awarded	(Italy) Gino Bartali	not awarded
1940	(Italy) Fausto Coppi	not awarded	(Italy) Gino Bartali	not awarded
1941 to 1945: suspended because of World War II
1946	(Italy) Gino Bartali	not awarded	(Italy) Gino Bartali	not awarded
1947	(Italy) Fausto Coppi	not awarded	(Italy) Gino Bartali	not awarded
1948	(Italy) Fiorenzo Magni	not awarded	(Italy) Fausto Coppi	not awarded
1949	(Italy) Fausto Coppi	not awarded	(Italy) Fausto Coppi	not awarded
1950	(Switzerland) Hugo Koblet	not awarded	(Switzerland) Hugo Koblet	not awarded
1951	(Italy) Fiorenzo Magni	not awarded	(France) Louison Bobet	not awarded
1952	(Italy) Fausto Coppi	not awarded	(France) Raphaël Géminiani	not awarded
1953	(Italy) Fausto Coppi	not awarded	(Italy) Pasquale Fornara	not awarded
1954	(Switzerland) Carlo Clerici	not awarded	(Italy) Fausto Coppi	not awarded
1955	(Italy) Fiorenzo Magni	not awarded	(Italy) Gastone Nencini	not awarded
1956	(Luxembourg) Charly Gaul	not awarded	(Luxembourg) Charly Gaul	not awarded
1957	(Italy) Gastone Nencini	not awarded	(France) Raphaël Géminiani	not awarded
1958	(Italy) Ercole Baldini	not awarded	(Belgium) Jean Brankart	not awarded
1959	(Luxembourg) Charly Gaul	not awarded	(Luxembourg) Charly Gaul	not awarded
1960	(France) Jacques Anquetil	not awarded	(Belgium) Rik Van Looy	not awarded
1961	(Italy) Arnaldo Pambianco	not awarded	(Italy) Vito Taccone	not awarded
1962	(Italy) Franco Balmamion	not awarded	(Spain) Angelino Soler	not awarded
1963	(Italy) Franco Balmamion	not awarded	(Italy) Vito Taccone	not awarded
1964	(France) Jacques Anquetil	not awarded	(Italy) Franco Bitossi	not awarded
1965	(Italy) Vittorio Adorni	not awarded	(Italy) Franco Bitossi	not awarded
1966	(Italy) Gianni Motta	(Italy) Gianni Motta	(Italy) Franco Bitossi	not awarded
1967	(Italy) Felice Gimondi	(Italy) Dino Zandegù	(Spain) Aurelio González	not awarded
1968	(Belgium) Eddy Merckx	(Belgium) Eddy Merckx	(Belgium) Eddy Merckx	not awarded
1969	(Italy) Felice Gimondi	(Italy) Franco Bitossi	(Italy) Claudio Michelotto	not awarded
1970	(Belgium) Eddy Merckx	(Italy) Franco Bitossi	(Belgium) Martin Van Den Bossche	not awarded
1971	(Sweden) Gösta Pettersson	(Italy) Marino Basso	(Spain) José Manuel Fuente	not awarded
1972	(Belgium) Eddy Merckx	(Belgium) Roger De Vlaeminck	(Spain) José Manuel Fuente	not awarded
1973	(Belgium) Eddy Merckx	(Belgium) Eddy Merckx	(Spain) José Manuel Fuente	not awarded
1974	(Belgium) Eddy Merckx	(Belgium) Roger De Vlaeminck	(Spain) José Manuel Fuente	not awarded
1975	(Italy) Fausto Bertoglio	(Belgium) Roger De Vlaeminck	(Spain) Andrés Oliva (Spain) Francisco Galdós	not awarded
1976	(Italy) Felice Gimondi	(Italy) Francesco Moser	(Spain) Andrés Oliva	(Italy) Alfio Vandi
1977	(Belgium) Michel Pollentier	(Italy) Francesco Moser	(Spain) Faustino Fernández Ovies	(Italy) Mario Beccia
1978	(Belgium) Johan de Muynck	(Italy) Francesco Moser	(Switzerland) Ueli Sutter	(Italy) Roberto Visentini
1979	(Italy) Giuseppe Saronni	(Italy) Giuseppe Saronni	(Italy) Claudio Bortolotto	(Italy) Silvano Contini
1980	(France) Bernard Hinault	(Italy) Giuseppe Saronni	(Italy) Claudio Bortolotto	(Sweden) Tommy Prim
1981	(Italy) Giovanni Battaglin	(Italy) Giuseppe Saronni	(Italy) Claudio Bortolotto	(Italy) Giuseppe Faraca
1982	(France) Bernard Hinault	(Italy) Francesco Moser	(Belgium) Lucien Van Impe	(Italy) Marco Groppo
1983	(Italy) Giuseppe Saronni	(Italy) Giuseppe Saronni	(Belgium) Lucien Van Impe	(Italy) Franco Chioccioli
1984	(Italy) Francesco Moser	(Switzerland) Urs Freuler	(France) Laurent Fignon	(France) Charly Mottet
1985	(France) Bernard Hinault	(Netherlands) Johan van der Velde	(Spain) José Luis Navarro	(Italy) Alberto Volpi
1986	(Italy) Roberto Visentini	(Italy) Guido Bontempi	(Spain) Pedro Muñoz	(Italy) Marco Giovannetti
1987	(Republic of Ireland) Stephen Roche	(Netherlands) Johan van der Velde	(United Kingdom) Robert Millar	(Italy) Roberto Conti
1988	(United States) Andrew Hampsten	(Netherlands) Johan van der Velde	(United States) Andrew Hampsten	(Italy) Stefano Tomasini
1989	(France) Laurent Fignon	(Italy) Giovanni Fidanza	(Colombia) Luis Herrera	(Soviet Union) Vladimir Poulnikov
1990	(Italy) Gianni Bugno	(Italy) Gianni Bugno	(Italy) Claudio Chiappucci	(Soviet Union) Vladimir Poulnikov
1991	(Italy) Franco Chioccioli	(Italy) Claudio Chiappucci	(Spain) Iñaki Gastón Crespo	(Italy) Massimiliano Lelli
1992	(Spain) Miguel Indurain	(Italy) Mario Cipollini	(Italy) Claudio Chiappucci	(Russia) Pavel Tonkov
1993	(Spain) Miguel Indurain	(Italy) Adriano Baffi	(Italy) Claudio Chiappucci	(Russia) Pavel Tonkov
1994	(Russia) Evgeni Berzin	(Uzbekistan) Djamolidine Abdoujaparov	(Switzerland) Pascal Richard	(Russia) Evgeni Berzin
1995	(Switzerland) Tony Rominger	(Switzerland) Tony Rominger	(Italy) Mariano Piccoli	not awarded
1996	(Russia) Pavel Tonkov	(Italy) Fabrizio Guidi	(Italy) Mariano Piccoli	not awarded
1997	(Italy) Ivan Gotti	(Italy) Mario Cipollini	(Colombia) Chepe González	not awarded
1998	(Italy) Marco Pantani	(Italy) Mariano Piccoli	(Italy) Marco Pantani	not awarded
1999	(Italy) Ivan Gotti	(France) Laurent Jalabert	(Colombia) Chepe González	not awarded
2000	(Italy) Stefano Garzelli	(Russia) Dimitri Konyshev	(Italy) Francesco Casagrande	not awarded
2001	(Italy) Gilberto Simoni	(Italy) Massimo Strazzer	(Colombia) Fredy González	not awarded
2002	(Italy) Paolo Savoldelli	(Italy) Mario Cipollini	(Mexico) Julio Alberto Pérez	not awarded
2003	(Italy) Gilberto Simoni	(Italy) Gilberto Simoni	(Colombia) Fredy González	not awarded
2004	(Italy) Damiano Cunego	(Italy) Alessandro Petacchi	(Germany) Fabian Wegmann	not awarded
2005	(Italy) Paolo Savoldelli	(Italy) Paolo Bettini	(Venezuela) José Rujano Guillen	not awarded
2006	(Italy) Ivan Basso	(Italy) Paolo Bettini	(Spain) Juan Manuel Gárate	not awarded
2007	(Italy) Danilo Di Luca	not awarded	(Italy) Leonardo Piepoli	(Luxembourg) Andy Schleck
2008	(Spain) Alberto Contador	(Italy) Daniele Bennati	(Italy) Emanuele Sella	(Italy) Riccardo Riccò
2009	(Russia) Denis Menchov	(Russia) Denis Menchov	(Italy) Stefano Garzelli	(Belgium) Kevin Seeldraeyers
2010	(Italy) Ivan Basso	(Australia) Cadel Evans	(Australia) Matthew Lloyd	(Australia) Richie Porte
2011	(Italy) Michele Scarponi	(Italy) Michele Scarponi	(Italy) Stefano Garzelli	(Czech Republic) Roman Kreuziger
2012	(Canada) Ryder Hesjedal	(Spain) Joaquim Rodríguez	(Italy) Matteo Rabottini	(Colombia) Rigoberto Urán
2013	(Italy) Vincenzo Nibali	(United Kingdom) Mark Cavendish	(Italy) Stefano Pirazzi	(Colombia) Carlos Betancur
2014	(Colombia) Nairo Quintana	(France) Nacer Bouhanni	(Colombia) Julián Arredondo	(Colombia) Nairo Quintana
2015	(Spain) Alberto Contador	(Italy) Giacomo Nizzolo	(Italy) Giovanni Visconti	(Italy) Fabio Aru
2016	(Italy) Vincenzo Nibali	(Italy) Giacomo Nizzolo	(Spain) Mikel Nieve	(Luxembourg) Bob Jungels
2017	(Netherlands) Tom Dumoulin	(Colombia) Fernando Gaviria	(Spain) Mikel Landa	(Luxembourg) Bob Jungels
2018	(United Kingdom) Chris Froome	(Italy) Elia Viviani	(United Kingdom) Chris Froome	(Colombia) Miguel Ángel López
2019	(Ecuador) Richard Carapaz	(Germany) Pascal Ackermann	(Italy) Giulio Ciccone	(Colombia) Miguel Ángel López
2020	(United Kingdom) Tao Geoghegan Hart	(France) Arnaud Démare	(Portugal) Ruben Guerreiro	(United Kingdom) Tao Geoghegan Hart
2021	(Colombia) Egan Bernal	(Slovakia) Peter Sagan	(France) Geoffrey Bouchard	(Colombia) Egan Bernal
2022	(Australia) Jai Hindley	(France) Arnaud Démare	(Netherlands) Koen Bouwman	(Spain) Juan Pedro López Pérez
2023	(Slovenia) Primož Roglič	(Italy) Jonathan Milan	(France) Thibaut Pinot	(Portugal) João Almeida
2024	(Slovenia) Tadej Pogačar	(Italy) Jonathan Milan	(Slovenia) Tadej Pogačar	(Italy) Antonio Tiberi
2025	(United Kingdom) Simon Yates	(Denmark) Mads Pedersen	(Italy) Lorenzo Fortunato	(Mexico) Isaac del Toro
2026	(Denmark) Jonas Vingegaard	(France) Paul Magnier	(Italy) Giulio Ciccone	(Portugal) Afonso Eulalio

== Multiple winners ==
Cyclist	Total	Years
Alfredo Binda (ITA)	5	1925, 1927, 1928, 1929, 1933
Fausto Coppi (ITA)	5	1940, 1947, 1949, 1952, 1953
Eddy Merckx (BEL)	5	1968, 1970, 1972, 1973, 1974
Giovanni Brunero (ITA)	3	1921, 1922, 1926
Gino Bartali (ITA)	3	1936, 1937, 1946
Fiorenzo Magni (ITA)	3	1948, 1951, 1955
Felice Gimondi (ITA)	3	1967, 1969, 1976
Bernard Hinault (FRA)	3	1980, 1982, 1985
Carlo Galetti (ITA)	2	1910, 1911
Costante Girardengo (ITA)	2	1919, 1923
Giovanni Valetti (ITA)	2	1938, 1939
Charly Gaul (LUX)	2	1956, 1959
Franco Balmamion (ITA)	2	1962, 1963
Jacques Anquetil (FRA)	2	1960, 1964
Giuseppe Saronni (ITA)	2	1979, 1983
Miguel Indurain (ESP)	2	1992, 1993
Ivan Gotti (ITA)	2	1997, 1999
Gilberto Simoni (ITA)	2	2001, 2003
Paolo Savoldelli (ITA)	2	2002, 2005
Ivan Basso (ITA)	2	2006, 2010
Alberto Contador (ESP)	2	2008, 2015
Vincenzo Nibali (ITA)	2	2013, 2016

== Winners by country ==
Country	Victories	First title	Last title
Italy	69	1909	2016
Belgium	7	1968	1978
France	6	1960	1989
Spain	4	1992	2015
Switzerland	3	1950	1995
Russia	3	1994	2009
Great Britain	3	2018	2025
Luxembourg	2	1956	1959
Colombia	2	2014	2021
Slovenia	2	2023	2024
Sweden	1	1971	1971
Ireland	1	1987	1987
USA	1	1988	1988
Canada	1	2012	2012
Netherlands	1	2017	2017
Ecuador	1	2019	2019
Australia	1	2022	2022
Denmark	1	2026	2026
