= 1929 Giro d'Italia =

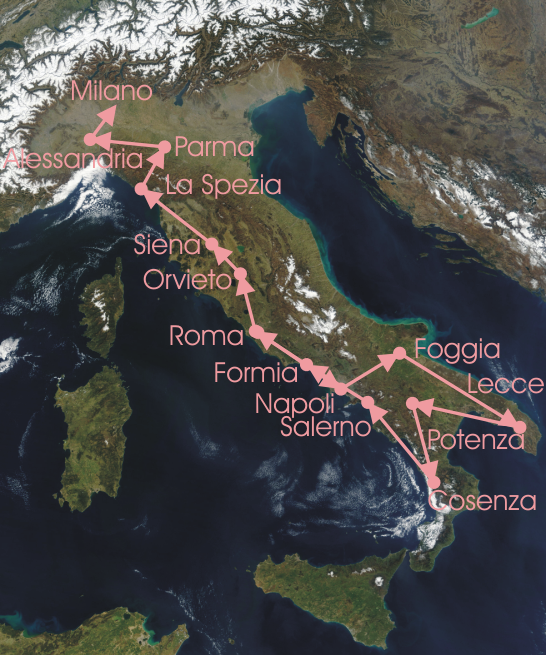
- Race Route

Race details
- Dates: May 19 – June 9, 1929
- Stages: 14
- Distance: 2,920 km (1,814 mi)
- Winning time: 107h 18' 24s

Results
	Winner	Alfredo Binda (ITA)	(Legnano)
	Second	Domenico Piemontesi (ITA)	(Bianchi)
	Third	Leonida Frascarelli (ITA)	(Ideor)

The 1929 Giro d'Italia was the 17th edition of the Giro d'Italia, organized and sponsored by the newspaper La Gazzetta dello Sport. The race began on 19 May in Rome with a stage that stretched 235 km (146 mi) to Naples, finishing in Milan on 9 June after a 216 km (134 mi) stage and a total distance covered of 2,920 km (1,814 mi). The race was won by the Alfredo Binda of the Legnano team. Second and third respectively were the Italian riders Domenico Piemontesi and Leonida Frascarelli.

== Participants ==
Of the 166 riders that began the Giro d'Italia on 19 May, 99 of them made it to the finish in Milan on 9 June. Riders were allowed to ride on their own or as a member of a team. There were eight teams that competed in the race: Bianchi-Pirelli, Gloria-Hutchinson, Ideor-Pirelli, Legnano-Hutchinson, Maino-Clément, Prina-Pirelli, Touring-Pirelli, and Wolsit-Hutchinson.

The peloton was primarily composed of Italians. Alfredo Binda, a three-time winner and reigning champion, came in as the favorite to win the race. Outside of Binda, the field featured only one other Giro d'Italia winner in Gaetano Belloni who won the 1920 running. Other notable Italian riders that started the race included Giuseppe Pancera, Antonio Negrini, and Domenico Piemontesi.

== Race summary ==
The first stage was won by Belloni, who was 36 years old. He was the oldest stage winner in the Giro at that point, and would hold this record until Alessandro Bertolini won a stage in the 2008 Giro d'Italia. Belloni automatically also became the first leader of the general classification, where he also took the record for oldest leader; this record would be broken in 1971 by Aldo Moser.

From the second to the ninth stage, Binda set a record of eight consecutive stage victories. Belloni lost six minutes in stage 4, handing over the lead to Binda, and lost an hour in stage 5.

On the eighth stage, Belloni was behind the peloton after a crash, and while he was chasing them back, a young boy jumped in front of his bike. Belloni collided with the young boy, killing the young boy. Belloni abandoned the race.

After the ninth stage, Binda's lead in the general classification was not large, because most stages had finished in a large sprint.

In the thirteenth stage, Binda won the sprint. The jury however decided that the sprint of the first four riders had been irregular, giving the victory to the fifth rider.

After the last stage had finished in the Arena stadium in Milan, the spectators turned against Binda, because fans were tired of his hegemony. For the next Giro, Binda would be paid by the Giro organisation to stay away, with the goal of making the Giro more exciting for the fans.

== Final standings ==
=== Stage results ===
This Giro was the first Giro to have an extended visit to the South of Italy.

Stage results
Stage	Date	Course	Distance	Type (Note: In 1929, there was no distinction in the rules between plain stages and mountain stages; the icons shown here indicate that the first, second, fourth, sixth, seventh, ninth, tenth, twelfth, and fourteenth stages included major mountains.)	Winner	Race Leader
1	19 May	Rome to Naples	235 km (146 mi)	Stage with mountain(s)	Gaetano Belloni (ITA)	Gaetano Belloni (ITA)
2	21 May	Naples to Foggia	185 km (115 mi)	Stage with mountain(s)	Alfredo Binda (ITA)	Gaetano Belloni (ITA)
3	23 May	Foggia to Lecce	282 km (175 mi)	Plain stage	Alfredo Binda (ITA)	Gaetano Belloni (ITA)
4	25 May	Lecce to Potenza	270 km (168 mi)	Stage with mountain(s)	Alfredo Binda (ITA)	Alfredo Binda (ITA)
5	27 May	Potenza to Cosenza	264 km (164 mi)	Plain stage	Alfredo Binda (ITA)	Alfredo Binda (ITA)
6	29 May	Cosenza to Salerno	295 km (183 mi)	Stage with mountain(s)	Alfredo Binda (ITA)	Alfredo Binda (ITA)
7	31 May	Salerno to Formia	220 km (137 mi)	Plain stage	Alfredo Binda (ITA)	Alfredo Binda (ITA)
8	2 June	Formia to Rome	198 km (123 mi)	Plain stage	Alfredo Binda (ITA)	Alfredo Binda (ITA)
9	3 June	Rome to Orvieto	120 km (75 mi)	Stage with mountain(s)	Alfredo Binda (ITA)	Alfredo Binda (ITA)
10	4 June	Orvieto to Siena	150 km (93 mi)	Stage with mountain(s)	Mario Bianchi (ITA)	Alfredo Binda (ITA)
11	5 June	Siena to La Spezia	192 km (119 mi)	Plain stage	Alfredo Dinale (ITA)	Alfredo Binda (ITA)
12	7 June	La Spezia to Parma	135 km (84 mi)	Stage with mountain(s)	Domenico Piemontesi (ITA)	Alfredo Binda (ITA)
13	8 June	Parma to Alessandria	152 km (94 mi)	Plain stage	Mario Bianchi (ITA)	Alfredo Binda (ITA)
14	9 June	Alessandria to Milan	216 km (134 mi)	Stage with mountain(s)	Alfredo Dinale (ITA)	Alfredo Binda (ITA)
Total		2,920 km (1,814 mi)				

=== General classification ===
There were 99 cyclists who had completed all fourteen stages. For these cyclists, the times they had needed in each stage was added up for the general classification. The cyclist with the least accumulated time was the winner.

Final general classification (1–10)
Rank	Name	Team	Time
1	Alfredo Binda (ITA)	Legnano	107h 18' 24"
2	Domenico Piemontesi (ITA)	Bianchi	+ 3' 44"
3	Leonida Frascarelli (ITA)	Ideor	+ 5' 04"
4	Antonio Negrini (ITA)	Maino	+ 6' 36"
5	Luigi Giacobbe (ITA)	Maino	+ 8' 43"
6	Allegro Grandi (ITA)	Bianchi	+ 12' 52"
7	Giuseppe Pancera (ITA)	La Rafale	+ 14' 44"
8	Alfonso Piccin (ITA)	Bianchi	+ 15' 29"
9	Michele Orecchia (ITA)	La Rafale	+ 15' 33"
10	Ambrogio Morelli (ITA)	Gloria-Hutchinson	+ 16' 29"

=== Junior rider classification ===
Final junior rider classification (1–5)
Rank	Name	Team	Time
1	Leonida Frascarelli (ITA)	Ideor	107h 23' 28"
2	Allegro Grandi (ITA)	Bianchi	+ 7' 48"
3	Michele Orecchia (ITA)	La Rafale	+ 10' 29"
4	Albino Binda (ITA)	Legnano	+ 13' 27"
5	Alessandro Catalani (ITA)	Wolsit	+ 24' 12"

=== Independent rider classification ===
Final independent rider classification (1–5)
Rank	Name	Time
1	Ambrogio Morelli (ITA)	107h 34' 33"
2	Felice Gremo (ITA)	+ 2' 10"
3	Carlo Rovida (ITA)	+ 3' 58"
4	Pietro Mori (ITA)	+ 5' 23"
5	Michele Mara (ITA)	+ 8' 23"
