= 1927 UCI Road World Championships – Men's road race =

Men's Individual Road Race
1927 UCI Road World Championships
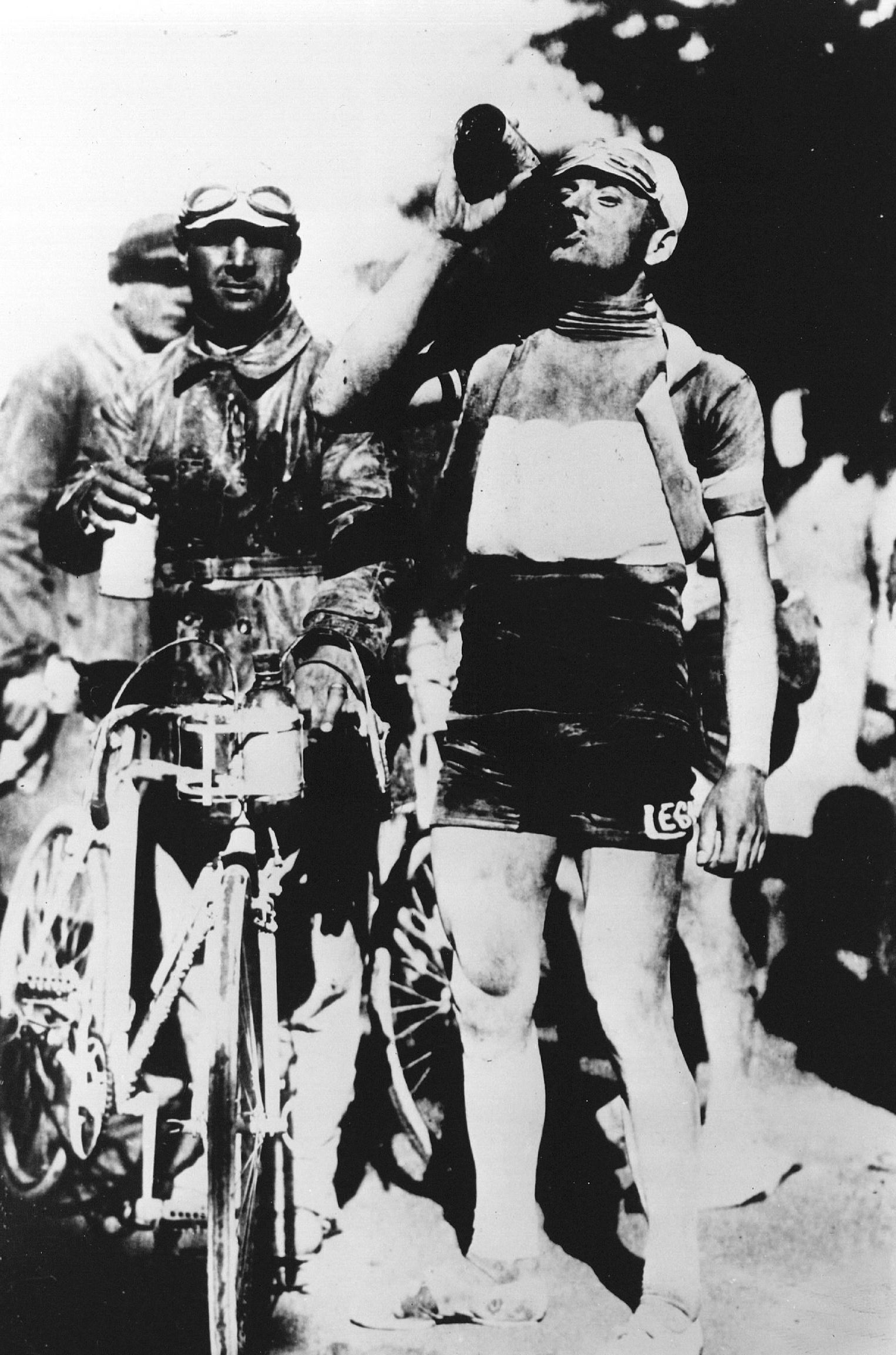
- Italian cyclist Alfredo Binda drinking next to his bike

Race details
- Dates: 21 July 1927
- Stages: 1
- Distance: 182.5 km (113.4 mi)
- Winning time: 6h 37' 29"

Results
	Winner	Alfredo Binda (ITA)	(Italy)
	Second	Costante Girardengo (ITA)	(Italy)
	Third	Domenico Piemontesi (ITA)	(Italy)

The men's road race at the 1927 UCI Road World Championships was the inaugural edition of the professional event. (Note: The peloton was formed of professionals and amateurs, and each were categorised accordingly. Previously, only amateur races had taken place since 1921.) The race took place on Thursday 21 July 1927 in Adenau, Germany. The race was won by Alfredo Binda of Italy.

This was the first year a world champion was crowned among professional cyclists. Professional cyclists and amateurs rode together, but separate rankings were drawn up for the two categories. A total of 55 riders competed, including 22 professionals.

== Race report ==
Eight laps on the circuit of almost 23 km had to be covered, 182 km in total. The course was very tough because of the many climbs (the bikes did not have bike gears back then).

The race was dominated by the Italians. Alfredo Binda escaped on the penultimate lap and became the first professional world champion with more than seven minutes advantage. Two of his compatriots completed the podium of the professionals. Belgian Jean Aerts was fifth and world amateur champion. In total, 18 riders would reach the finish.

== Final classification ==
General classification (1–10) (Note: Those starred (*) were amateur at the time of the event.)

Rank	Rider	Time
1st place, gold medalist(s)	Alfredo Binda (ITA)	6h 37' 29"
2nd place, silver medalist(s)	Costante Girardengo (ITA)	+ 7' 16"
3rd place, bronze medalist(s)	Domenico Piemontesi (ITA)	+ 10' 51"
4	Gaetano Belloni (ITA)	+ 11' 11"
5	Jean Aerts* (BEL)	+ 11' 51"
6	Rudolf Wolke* (GER)	+ 14' 24"
7	Michele Orecchia* (ITA)	+ 17' 50"
8	Erik Bohlin* (SWE)	+ 18' 06"
9	René Brossy* (FRA)	+ 19' 33"
10	Herbert Nebe (GER)	+ 23' 03"
