= 1926 Giro di Lombardia =

Race details
- Dates: 31 October 1926
- Stages: 1
- Distance: 251 km (156.0 mi)
- Winning time: 9h 52' 32"

Results
	Winner	Alfredo Binda (ITA)
	Second	Antonio Negrini (ITA)
	Third	Ermanno Vallazza (ITA)

The 1926 Giro di Lombardia was the 22nd edition of the Giro di Lombardia cycle race and was held on 31 October 1926. The race started and finished in Milan. The race was won by Alfredo Binda.

== General classification ==
Final general classification

Rank	Rider	Team	Time
1	Alfredo Binda (ITA)	Legnano-Pirelli	9h 52' 32"
2	Antonio Negrini (ITA)	Wolsit-Pirelli	+ 29' 40"
3	Ermanno Vallazza (ITA)	Legnano-Pirelli	+ 29' 40"
4	Ottavio Bottecchia (ITA)	Automoto-Hutchinson	+ 32' 18"
5	Umberto Brivio (ITA)		+ 33' 12"
6	Domenico Piemontesi (ITA)	Alcyon-Dunlop	+ 33' 26"
7	Marco Giuntelli (ITA)		+ 35' 05"
8	Secondo Martinetto (ITA)	Méteore-Wolber	+ 1h 01' 28"
9	Aimé Dossche (BEL)	Christophe-Hutchinson	+ 1h 01' 28"
10	Battista Gilli (ITA)		+ 1h 08' 28"
