= 1925 Giro di Lombardia =

Race details
- Dates: 4 November 1925
- Stages: 1
- Distance: 251 km (156 mi)
- Winning time: 8h 43' 40"

Results
	Winner	Alfredo Binda (ITA)
	Second	Battista Giuntelli (ITA)
	Third	Ermanno Vallazza (ITA)

The 1925 Giro di Lombardia was the 21st edition of the Giro di Lombardia cycle race and was held on 4 November 1925. The race started and finished in Milan. The race was won by Alfredo Binda.

== General classification ==
Final general classification

Rank	Rider	Team	Time
1	Alfredo Binda (ITA)	Legnano-Pirelli	8h 43' 40"
2	Battista Giuntelli (ITA)		+ 8' 20"
3	Ermanno Vallazza (ITA)	Legnano-Pirelli	+ 10' 30"
4	Adriano Zanaga (ITA)		+ 15' 00"
5	Giovanni Brunero (ITA)	Legnano-Pirelli	+ 15' 00"
6	Bartolomeo Aimo (ITA)		+ 15' 01"
7	Egidio Picchiottino (ITA)	Maino	+ 15' 01"
8	Marco Giuntelli (ITA)		+ 16' 30"
9	Giuseppe Pancera (ITA)	Legnano-Pirelli	+ 17' 40"
10	Michele Robotti (ITA)		+ 17' 40"
