= 1931 Milan–San Remo =

Race details
- Dates: 22 March 1931
- Stages: 1
- Distance: 286 km (178 mi)
- Winning time: 9h 35' 00"

Results
	Winner	Alfredo Binda (ITA)
	Second	Learco Guerra (ITA)
	Third	Domenico Piemontesi (ITA)

The 1931 Milan–San Remo was the 24th edition of the Milan–San Remo cycle race and was held on 22 March 1931. The race started in Milan and finished in San Remo. The race was won by Alfredo Binda.

== General classification ==
Final general classification

Rank	Rider	Time
1	Alfredo Binda (ITA)	9h 35' 00"
2	Learco Guerra (ITA)	+ 0"
3	Domenico Piemontesi (ITA)	+ 0"
4	Fabio Battesini (ITA)	+ 0"
5	Michele Mara (ITA)	+ 0"
6	Pio Caimmi (ITA)	+ 0"
6	Alfredo Carniselli (ITA)	+ 0"
6	Emilio Codazza (ITA)	+ 0"
6	Leonida Frascarelli (ITA)	+ 0"
6	Allegro Grandi (ITA)	+ 0"
