= 1931 Giro di Lombardia =

Race details
- Dates: 25 October 1931
- Stages: 1
- Distance: 234 km (145.4 mi)
- Winning time: 8h 29' 00"

Results
	Winner	Alfredo Binda (ITA)
	Second	Michele Mara (ITA)
	Third	Giovanni Firpo (ITA)

The 1931 Giro di Lombardia was the 27th edition of the Giro di Lombardia cycle race and was held on 25 October 1931. The race started and finished in Milan. The race was won by Alfredo Binda.

== General classification ==
Final general classification

Rank	Rider	Team	Time
1	Alfredo Binda (ITA)	Legnano	8h 29' 00"
2	Michele Mara (ITA)	Bianchi	+ 18' 33"
3	Giovanni Firpo (ITA)	Gloria	+ 18' 33"
4	Luigi Marchisio (ITA)	Legnano	+ 18' 33"
5	Alfredo Bovet (ITA)	Bianchi	+ 18' 33"
6	Allegro Grandi (ITA)	Bianchi	+ 18' 33"
7	Agostino Bellandi (ITA)		+ 24' 00"
8	Guglielmo Marin (ITA)	Touring-Pirelli	+ 25' 30"
9	Theo Heimann (SUI)		+ 25' 30"
10	Antonio Pesenti (ITA)		+ 30' 00"
