= Coppa Placci =

Semi-classic European bicycle race

Race details
- Date: Mid-October
- Region: Emilia, Italy
- English name: Placci Cup
- Local name(s): Coppa Placci (in Italian)
- Discipline: Road
- Competition: UCI Europe Tour
- Type: One-day
- Organiser: Unione Sportiva Imolese
- Web site: www.coppaplacci.it

History
- First edition: 1923
- Editions: 59 (as of 2009)
- First winner: (Italy) Enea Dal Fiume
- Most wins: (Italy) Emilio Petiva (Italy) Ugo Colombo (Belgium) Roger De Vlaeminck (Italy) Giovanni Battaglin (Italy) Francesco Casagrande (2 wins)
- Most recent: (Italy) Filippo Pozzato

The Coppa Placci is a semi-classic European bicycle race held between Imola, Italy and San Marino. Since 2005, the race has been organised as a 1.HC event on the UCI Europe Tour.

The race is named after Antonio Placci, a cyclist born in Imola who died in 1921, two years before the race was created.

Because of sponsorship problems, in 2010 the race has been excluded from the UCI Europe Tour and was reserved to the Elite/Under 23 Category.

In 2011 the race was held as Giro della Romagna – Coppa Placci and won by Oscar Gatto.

In 2012 the race also merged with another Italian classic, the Giro del Veneto; the Giro del Veneto – Coppa Placci was won again by Oscar Gatto.

The race should have returned in 2013 as Coppa Placci. The edition was scheduled on 16 October 2013 as a 1.1 event; however, the race was later cancelled again.

== Winners ==
Year	Country	Rider	Team
1923	Italy	Enea Dal Fiume	
1924	Italy	Emilio Petiva	
1925	Italy	Emilio Petiva	
1926	Italy	Ermanno Vallazza	
1927	Italy	Aleardo Simoni	
1928	Italy	Pietro Fossati	
1929–1945	No race		
1946	Italy	Nedo Logli	
1947	No race		
1948	Italy	Luigi Casola	
1949	Italy	Renzo Soldani	
1950	Italy	Giacomo Zampieri	
1951–1952	No race		
1953	Italy	Luciano Maggini	
1954–1961	No race		
1962	Italy	Franco Cribori	
1963	Italy	Ercole Baldini	
1964	Italy	Guido De Rosso	
1965	Italy	Michele Dancelli	
1966	Italy	Felice Gimondi	
1967	Italy	Luciano Armani	
1968	No race		
1969	Italy	Roberto Ballini	
1970	Italy	Ugo Colombo	
1971	Italy	Ugo Colombo	
1972	Belgium	Roger De Vlaeminck	
1973	Italy	Italo Zilioli	
1974	Belgium	Roger De Vlaeminck	
1975	Italy	Francesco Moser	
1976	Italy	Fausto Bertoglio	
1977	Italy	Marino Basso	
1978	Italy	Gianbattista Baronchelli	
1979	Italy	Giovanni Battaglin	
1980	Italy	Giovanni Battaglin	
1981	Italy	Alfio Vandi	
1982	Italy	Alfredo Chinetti	
1983	Italy	Marino Amadori	
1984	Portugal	Acacio Da Silva	
1985	Italy	Silvano Contini	
1986	Italy	Guido Bontempi	
1987	Italy	Massimo Ghirotto	
1988	Italy	Piermattia Gavazzi	
1989	Italy	Claudio Chiappucci	
1990	Switzerland	Mauro Gianetti	
1991	Switzerland	Laurent Dufaux	
1992	Belgium	Johan Bruyneel	
1993	Italy	Maximillian Sciandri	
1994	Italy	Angelo Lecchi	
1995	Italy	Francesco Casagrande	
1996	Italy	Andrea Tafi	
1997	Switzerland	Beat Zberg	
1998	Italy	Mauro Zanetti	
1999	Italy	Mirko Celestino	
2000	Italy	Francesco Casagrande	
2001	Italy	Paolo Bettini	
2002	Italy	Matteo Tosatto	
2003	Italy	Danilo Di Luca	
2004	Italy	Leonardo Bertagnolli	
2005	Italy	Paolo Valoti	
2006	Italy	Rinaldo Nocentini	
2007	Italy	Alessandro Bertolini	
2008	Italy	Luca Paolini	
2009	Italy	Filippo Pozzato	Team Katusha
2010	Italy	Francesco Bongiorno	Futura Team-Matricardi
2011*	Italy	Oscar Gatto	Farnese Vini–Neri Sottoli
2012**	Italy	Oscar Gatto	Farnese Vini–Selle Italia

*as Giro della Romagna – Coppa Placci
**as Giro del Veneto – Coppa Placci
