= Rovida =

Rovida is an Italian surname. Notable people with the surname include:

- Carlo Rovida (1905–unknown), Italian racing cyclist
- Edoardo Rovida (1927–2026), Italian Roman Catholic archbishop and apostolic nuncio
- William Rovida (born 2003), Italian footballer
