= Orecchia =

Orecchia is an Italian surname meaning "ear". Notable people with the surname include:

- Giovanni Orecchia (born c. 1925), Italian rugby league player
- Michele Orecchia (1903–1981), Italian cyclist
