= Ermanno Vallazza =

Italian cyclist

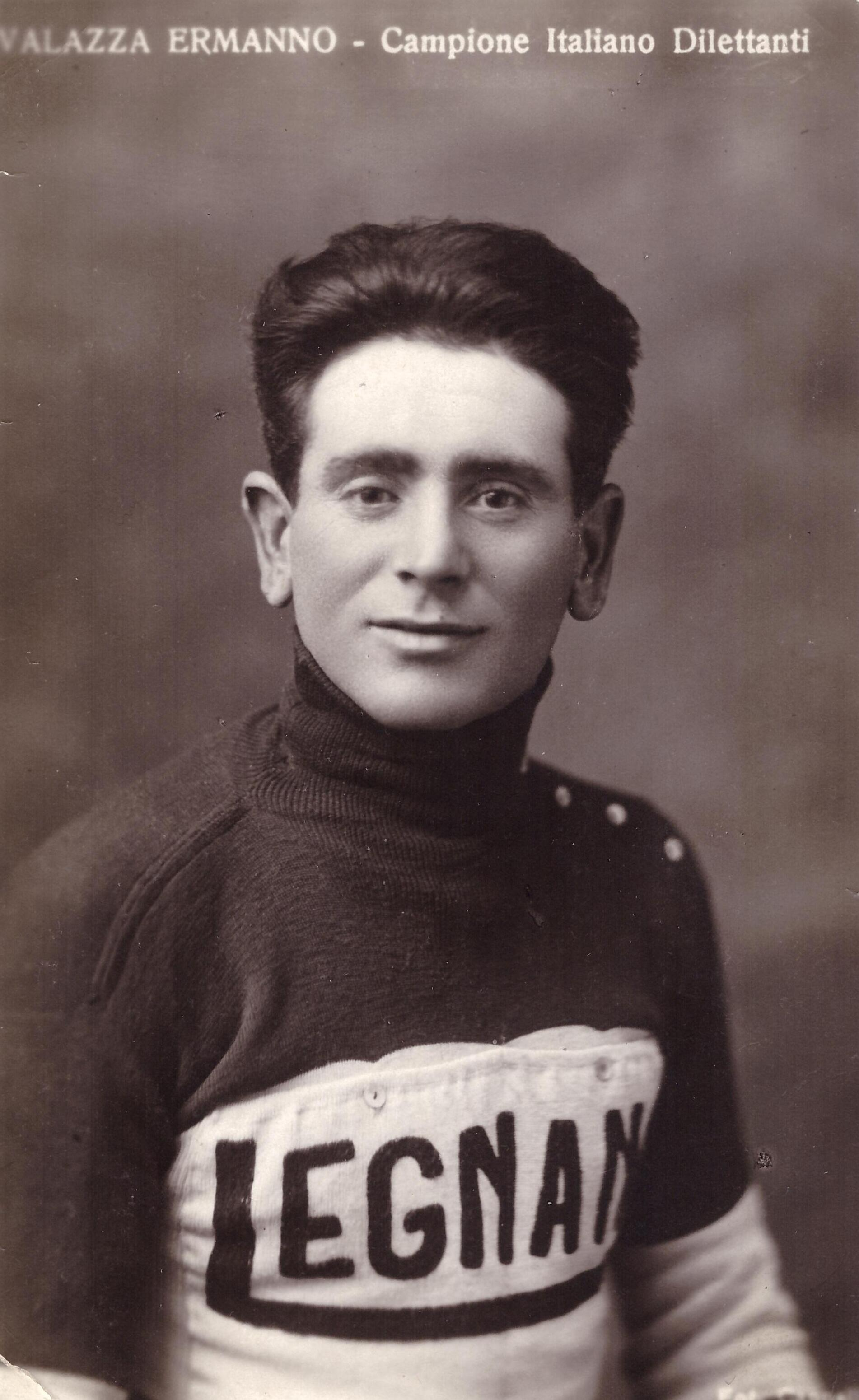

Personal information
- Born: 6 May 1899 Boca, Italy
- Died: 30 January 1978 (aged 78) Boca, Italy

Cycling career
- Sport: Cycling
- Discipline: Road
- Role: Rider

Professional teams
- 1924: Wolsit-Pirelli
- 1924–1927: Legnano
- 1928–1929: Bianchi

Ermanno Vallazza (6 May 1899, in Boca – 30 January 1978, in Boca) was an Italian cyclist.

== Major results ==
1923
9th Giro di Lombardia
1925
3rd Giro di Lombardia
6th Giro d'Italia
1926
1st Coppa Placci
3rd Giro di Lombardia
4th Giro d'Italia
1927
4th Giro d'Italia
1928
3rd Giro della Romagna
