= Giuseppe Brenna =

Italian cyclist

Personal information
- Born: 4 December 1898
- Died: 25 February 1980 (aged 81)

Cycling career
- Sport: Cycling
- Discipline: Road
- Role: Rider

Giuseppe Brenna (4 December 1898 – 25 February 1980) was an Italian racing cyclist. He rode in the 1924 Tour de France.
