= Wolsit (cycling team) =

Cycling team

Team information
- Registered: Italy
- Founded: 1910
- Disbanded: 1938
- Discipline: Road
- Bicycles: Wolsit

Team name history
- 1910 1925–1928 1929–1930 1932 1938: Wolsit; Wolsit–Pirelli; Wolsit; Wolsit–Hutchinson; Wolsit–Binda

Wolsit was an Italian professional cycling team that existed in part between 1910 and 1938. Its main sponsor was Italian bicycle manufacturer Wolsit. The team had two riders that won the general classification of the Giro d'Italia, Alfredo Binda in 1928 and Antonio Pesenti in 1932.
