= 1925 Giro d'Italia =

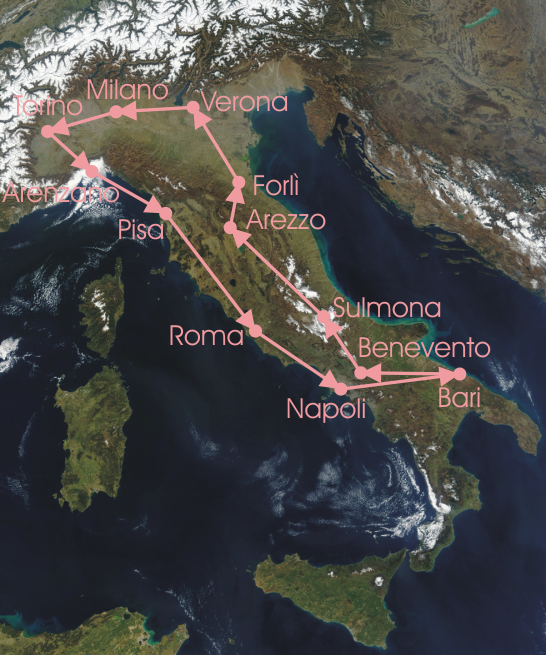
- Route of the 13th Giro d'Italia

Race details
- Dates: 16 May – 7 June 1925
- Stages: 12
- Distance: 3,520.5 km (2,187.5 mi)
- Winning time: 137h 31' 13"

Results
	Winner	Alfredo Binda (ITA)
	Second	Costante Girardengo (ITA)
	Third	Giovanni Brunero (ITA)

The 1925 Giro d'Italia was the 13th edition of the Giro d'Italia, a Grand Tour organized and sponsored by the newspaper La Gazzetta dello Sport. The race began on 16 May in Milan with a stage that stretched 278.1 km (173 mi) to Turin, finishing back in Milan on 7 June after a 307.9 km (191 mi) stage and a total distance covered of 3,520.5 km (2,188 mi). The race was won by the Alfredo Binda of the Legnano team. Second and third respectively were the Italian riders Costante Girardengo and Giovanni Brunero.

== Participants ==
Of the 126 riders who began the Giro d'Italia on 16 May, 39 of them made it to the finish in Milan on 7 June. As in the previous Giro, riders entered the race individually, not as part of a team. Most of the disagreements between the professional teams and the Giro organisation were resolved, so most teams agreed to send riders. There were six professional teams that had one or more riders competing in the race: Aliprandi-Pirelli, Jenis, Legnano-Pirelli, Olympia-Pirelli, Peugeot-Pirelli, and Wolsit-Pirelli.

The peloton was completely composed of Italians, a trend which continued until the 1950s because of Italy's fascist policies and political climate. The field featured two former Giro d'Italia champions in the 1919 Giro d'Italia winner Costante Girardengo and returning champion Giovanni Brunero. Other notable Italian riders who started the race included Gaetano Belloni, Giovanni Rossignoli, and Pietro Bestetti. This was the first Giro d'Italia that Alfredo Binda competed in. The winner of 1924, Giuseppe Enrici, did not start this race, as he had moved to the French Armor-Dunlop team, and targeted the 1925 Tour de France.

== Race summary ==
In the first stage, eighteen riders rode away, taking almost five minutes on the others. Linari won the stage and became the leader, the main favourites were behind him in this group.

In the second stage, a group of four riders was away. The sprint was won by Girardengo, who then became the new leader based on his stage positions, Binda and Brunero were second and third in the general classification with the same time.

Girardengo and Binda finished in the first groups in the third and fourth stage, such that Girardengo was still leading with Binda in second place in the same time. Girardengo helped his team mate Bestetti to win the third stage, and won the fourth stage himself.

Another team mate of Girardengo was Gaetano Belloni, the winner of the 1920 Giro d'Italia. Belloni was not satisfied with Girardengo's support for Bestetti in a stage where Belloni struggled. In the fifth stage, Girardengo had a flat tire; Belloni decided to not help his team mate, but to help Binda escape. Belloni won the stage, but Girardengo lost more than five minutes, making Binda the new leader.

Girardengo tried to win back the lead in the next stages. He only won back seconds in the seventh stage. Despite winning six stages, he ended in second place in the general classification, with Binda as winner.

== Final standings ==
=== Stage results ===
Stage results
Stage	Date	Course	Distance	Type (Note: In 1925, there was no distinction in the rules between plain stages and mountain stages; the icons shown here indicate that the first, second, third, fourth, sixth, seventh, eighth, ninth, tenth, and twelfth stages included major mountains.)	Winner	Race Leader
1	16 May	Milan to Turin	278.1 km (173 mi)	Stage with mountain(s)	Pietro Linari (ITA)	Pietro Linari (ITA)
2	18 May	Turin to Arenzano	279.2 km (173 mi)	Stage with mountain(s)	Costante Girardengo (ITA)	Costante Girardengo (ITA); Alfredo Binda (ITA); Giovanni Brunero (ITA)
3	20 May	Arenzano to Pisa	315 km (196 mi)	Stage with mountain(s)	Pierino Bestetti (ITA)	Costante Girardengo (ITA); Alfredo Binda (ITA)
4	22 May	Pisa to Rome	337.1 km (209 mi)	Stage with mountain(s)	Costante Girardengo (ITA)	Costante Girardengo (ITA)
5	24 May	Rome to Naples	260 km (162 mi)	Plain stage	Gaetano Belloni (ITA)	Alfredo Binda (ITA)
6	26 May	Naples to Bari	314.2 km (195 mi)	Stage with mountain(s)	Alfredo Binda (ITA)	Alfredo Binda (ITA)
7	28 May	Bari to Benevento	234.9 km (146 mi)	Stage with mountain(s)	Costante Girardengo (ITA)	Alfredo Binda (ITA)
8	30 May	Benevento to Sulmona	275 km (171 mi)	Stage with mountain(s)	Giovanni Brunero (ITA)	Alfredo Binda (ITA)
9	1 June	Sulmona to Arezzo	376.8 km (234 mi)	Stage with mountain(s)	Costante Girardengo (ITA)	Alfredo Binda (ITA)
10	3 June	Arezzo to Forlì	224.3 km (139 mi)	Stage with mountain(s)	Costante Girardengo (ITA)	Alfredo Binda (ITA)
11	5 June	Forlì to Verona	318 km (198 mi)	Plain stage	Costante Girardengo (ITA)	Alfredo Binda (ITA)
12	7 June	Verona to Milan	307.9 km (191 mi)	Stage with mountain(s)	Gaetano Belloni (ITA)	Alfredo Binda (ITA)
	Total		3,520 km (2,187 mi)			

=== General classification ===
There were 39 cyclists who had completed all twelve stages. For these cyclists, the times they had needed in each stage was added up for the general classification. The cyclist with the least accumulated time was the winner; there were no time bonuses for stage winners. Riccardo Gagliardi won the prize for best ranked "indipendente" rider in the general classification, this was a category in between professional and amateur.

Final general classification (1–10)
Rank	Name	Team (Note: Riders rode individually in the 1925 Giro d'Italia; the team indicated here is the team that the riders rode for in the rest of the season.)	Time
1	Alfredo Binda (ITA)	Legnano	137h 31' 13"
2	Costante Girardengo (ITA)	Wolsit	+ 4' 58"
3	Giovanni Brunero (ITA)	Legnano	+ 7' 22"
4	Gaetano Belloni (ITA)	Wolsit	+ 26' 29"
5	Nello Ciaccheri (ITA)	Legnano	+ 37' 57"
6	Ermanno Vallazza (ITA)	Legnano	+ 1h 00' 27"
7	Pierino Bestetti (ITA)	Wolsit	+ 1h 15' 10"
8	Gianbattista Gilli (ITA)	—	+ 1h 25' 18"
9	Giovanni Trentarossi (ITA)	—	+ 1h 40' 45"
10	Pasquale Di Pietro (ITA)	—	+ 2h 31' 23"

Final general classification (11–39)
Rank	Name	Team	Time
11	Giuseppe Pancera (ITA)	Aliprandi-Pirelli	+ 2h 32' 24"
12	Michele Gordini (ITA)	—	+ 3h 08' 22"
13	Antonio Tecchio (ITA)	—	+ 3h 30' 39"
14	Ottavio Pratesi (ITA)	—	+ 4h 28' 47"
15	Riccardo Gagliardi (ITA)	—	+ 4h 45' 44"
16	Antonio Pancera (ITA)	—	+ 5h 17' 03"
17	Angelo Verona (ITA)	—	+ 5h 29' 24"
18	Azzelio Terreni (ITA)	—	+ 5h 50' 35"
19	Giovanni Rossignoli (ITA)	—	+ 6h 27' 46"
20	Giovanni Del Taglio (ITA)	—	+ 7h 41' 02"
21	Giuseppe Casadio (ITA)	—	+ 7h 54' 52"
22	Luigi Cecilli (ITA)	—	+ 8h 18' 18"
23	Guido Oddone (ITA)	—	+ 8h 50' 44"
24	Gino Petri (ITA)	—	+ 9h 04' 55"
25	Antonio De Franceschi (ITA)	—	+ 9h 26' 09"
26	Arnaldo Bergami (ITA)	—	+ 9h 39' 52"
27	Guido Messina (ITA)	—	+ 10h 09' 21"
28	Tito Brambilla (ITA)	—	+ 11h 09' 21"
29	Pierino Cazzaniga (ITA)	—	+ 11h 09' 39"
30	Antonio Buelli (ITA)	—	+ 11h 46' 24"
31	Augusto Rho (ITA)	—	+ 12h 26' 22"
32	Umberto Ripamonti (ITA)	—	+ 13h 11' 15"
33	Andrea Cazzaniga (ITA)	—	+ 15h 12' 24"
34	Paolo Baldieri (ITA)	—	+ 15h 23' 03"
35	Angelo Brumana (ITA)	—	+ 16h 07' 40"
36	Francesco Barbalonga (ITA)	—	+ 16h 48' 26"
37	Giuseppe Brenna (ITA)	—	+ 18h 41' 45"
38	Angelo Guidi (ITA)	—	+ 18h 45' 38"
39	Luigi Brivio (ITA)	—	+ 20h 29' 10"

== Aftermath ==
Girardengo lost the Giro despite winning a plurality of stages. In the next year, the Giro organization introduced a time bonus of 1:30 for the stage winner; had this been in place in 1925, Girardengo would have won the Giro.
