= Theo Heimann =

Swiss cyclist

Personal information
- Born: 1 May 1911 Reichenbach, Switzerland
- Died: 19 August 1979 (aged 68) Zollikon, Switzerland

Cycling career
- Sport: Cycling
- Discipline: Road
- Role: Rider

Theo Heimann (1 May 1911 – 19 August 1979) was a Swiss racing cyclist. He rode in the 1936 Tour de France.
