= Giovanni Firpo =

Italian cyclist

Personal information
- Born: 7 February 1909

Cycling career
- Sport: Cycling
- Discipline: Road
- Role: Rider

Giovanni Firpo (born 7 February 1909, date of death unknown) was an Italian racing cyclist. He rode in the 1933 Tour de France.
