= 1927 UCI Road World Championships =

- Venue: Nürburgring, Germany
- Date: 21 July 1927
- Coordinates: 50°23′N 6°56′E
- Events: 2

The 1927 UCI Road World Championships was the seventh edition of the UCI Road World Championships, and the first for professional cyclists.

The championship took place on the Nürburgring in Nürburg, Germany on Thursday 21 July 1927.

Professional and amateur riders rode together (33 of the starters were amateurs). 55 riders started and there were 18 classified finishers. The course was 182.5 km, and winner Alfredo Binda finished with an average speed 27.55 km/h

In the same period, the 1927 UCI Track Cycling World Championships was organized in the Müngersdorf velodrome in Cologne and in the Stadion am Zoo in Elberfeld.

== Events summary ==
Event	Gold		Silver		Bronze	
Men's Events
Professional Road Race	Alfredo Binda; Italy	6h 37m 29s	Costante Girardengo; Italy	+7m 16s	Domenico Piemontesi; Italy	+ 10m 51s
Amateur Road Race	Jean Aerts; Belgium	6h 49m 20s	Rudolf Wolke; Germany	+ 2m 33s	Michele Orecchia; Italy	+ 5m 59s

== See also ==
- 1927 UCI Track Cycling World Championships
