= Pietro Mori =

Italian cyclist

Personal information
- Born: 13 November 1908

Cycling career
- Sport: Cycling
- Discipline: Road
- Role: Rider

Pietro Mori (born 13 November 1908, date of death unknown) was an Italian racing cyclist. He rode in the 1931 Tour de France.
