= Pietro Fossati =

Italian cyclist

Personal information
- Born: 29 June 1905 Novi Ligure, Italy
- Died: 13 March 1945 (aged 39) Novi Ligure, Italy

Cycling career
- Sport: Cycling
- Role: Rider

Pietro Fossati (29 June 1905 – 13 March 1945) was an Italian racing cyclist. He won the 1929 edition of the Giro di Lombardia.
