= Carlo Rovida =

Italian cyclist

Personal information
- Born: 17 September 1905

Cycling career
- Sport: Cycling
- Discipline: Road
- Role: Rider

Carlo Rovida (born 17 September 1905, date of death unknown) was an Italian racing cyclist. He rode in the 1929 Tour de France.
