= Adriano Zanaga =

Italian cyclist (1896–1977)

Personal information
- Born: 14 January 1896 Padua, Italy
- Died: 31 January 1977 (aged 81)

Cycling career
- Sport: Cycling
- Role: Rider

Adriano Zanaga (14 January 1896 – 31 January 1977) was an Italian racing cyclist. He won stage 4 of the 1924 Giro d'Italia. In 1922 and 1925 he won Milano–Torino.
