= 1927 Giro d'Italia =

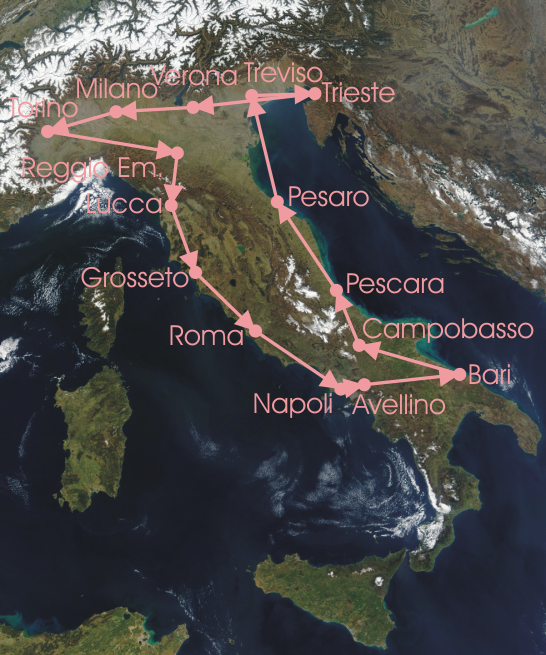
- Race Route

Race details
- Dates: 15 May – 6 June 1927
- Stages: 15
- Distance: 3,758.3 km (2,335 mi)
- Winning time: 144h 15' 35"

Results
	Winner	Alfredo Binda (ITA)	(Legnano)
	Second	Giovanni Brunero (ITA)	(Legnano)
	Third	Antonio Negrini (ITA)	(Wolsit-Pirelli)

The 1927 Giro d'Italia was the 15th edition of the Giro d'Italia, a Grand Tour organized and sponsored by the newspaper La Gazzetta dello Sport. The race began on 15 May in Milan with a stage that stretched 288 km (179 mi) to Turin, finishing back in Milan on 6 June after a 291.5 km (181 mi) stage and a total distance covered of 3,758.3 km (2,335 mi). The race was won by Alfredo Binda of the Legnano team. Second and third respectively were the Italian riders Giovanni Brunero and Antonio Negrini.

266 riders started the race, and 80 crossed the finish line of the final stage.

It was the first Giro with a modern design: in the same period of time of the previous Giro, three more stages were included, which replaced three days of rest. At the same time the stages became shorter (only one passed 300 km).

In 1927 Binda was at the apex of its career, and it triumphed winning 12 stages out of 15: a record still to be surpassed. Binda led the general classification from the first to the last stage (only Girardengo had already done it, in the 1919 Giro). In Binda's team there was also his brother Albino, as a support rider.

Giovanni Rossignoli, "virtual" winner of the first edition in 1909, participated for the last time. He was 45 years old and concluded the race in 44th place, about 7 hours behind Binda.

== Participants ==
Of the 266 riders that began the Giro d'Italia on 15 May, 80 of them made it to the finish in Milan on 6 June. Riders were allowed to ride on their own or as a member of a team. There were six teams that competed in the race: Aliprandi-Pirelli, Bianchi-Pirelli, Berettini-Hutchinson, Ganna-Dunlop, Legnano-Pirelli, and Wolsit-Pirelli.

The peloton was primarily composed of Italians. The field featured three former Giro d'Italia champions in three-time winner and reigning champion Giovanni Brunero, along with one-time winners Alfredo Binda and Giuseppe Enrici. Other notable Italian riders that started the race included Arturo Bresciani, Giovanni Rossignoli, and Domenico Piemontesi. Notable absentee was Costante Girardengo.

Among the starters was Luigi Ferri, almost fifty years old. Ferri is the oldest known rider to participate in the Giro, but did not finish the first stage.

== Race summary ==
From the start of the Giro, Binda was dominant. He won the first three stages; only Pancera, Giuntelli and Brunero finished in the same group as him in these three stages, and because of the time bonus for the stage wins, Binda was leading them by three minutes in the general classification.

Binda was beaten in the sprint for the fourth stage by Piemontesi, but showed his dominance by winning the next six stages. His winning streak was interrupted by Bresciani in the eleventh stage and Brunero in the thirteenth stage, but Binda won all other stages. In the end, Binda had won 12 out of 15 stages, a record that is unlikely to be ever beaten.

== Final standings ==
=== Stage results ===
An innovation in this Giro was the reduction of rest days. Previous editions always had a rest day in between stages, but in 1927 some stages were run on consecutive days.

Stage results
Stage	Date	Course	Distance	Type (Note: In 1927, there was no distinction in the rules between plain stages and mountain stages; the icons shown here indicate that the first, second, third, fifth, seventh, eighth, tenth, and fifteenth stages included major mountains.)	Winner	Race Leader
1	15 May	Milan to Turin	288 km (179 mi)	Stage with mountain(s)	Alfredo Binda (ITA)	Alfredo Binda (ITA)
2	17 May	Turin to Reggio Emilia	321 km (199 mi)	Stage with mountain(s)	Alfredo Binda (ITA)	Alfredo Binda (ITA)
3	19 May	Reggio Emilia to Lucca	207 km (129 mi)	Stage with mountain(s)	Alfredo Binda (ITA)	Alfredo Binda (ITA)
4	20 May	Lucca to Grosseto	240 km (149 mi)	Plain stage	Domenico Piemontesi (ITA)	Alfredo Binda (ITA)
5	22 May	Grosseto to Rome	257.6 km (160 mi)	Stage with mountain(s)	Alfredo Binda (ITA)	Alfredo Binda (ITA)
6	23 May	Rome to Naples	256.8 km (160 mi)	Plain stage	Alfredo Binda (ITA)	Alfredo Binda (ITA)
7	24 May	Naples to Avellino	153.4 km (95 mi)	Stage with mountain(s)	Alfredo Binda (ITA)	Alfredo Binda (ITA)
8	26 May	Avellino to Bari	271.8 km (169 mi)	Stage with mountain(s)	Alfredo Binda (ITA)	Alfredo Binda (ITA)
9	27 May	Bari to Campobasso	243.6 km (151 mi)	Plain stage	Alfredo Binda (ITA)	Alfredo Binda (ITA)
10	29 May	Campobasso to Pescara	220.2 km (137 mi)	Stage with mountain(s)	Alfredo Binda (ITA)	Alfredo Binda (ITA)
11	30 May	Pescara to Pesaro	218 km (135 mi)	Plain stage	Arturo Bresciani (ITA)	Alfredo Binda (ITA)
12	1 June	Pesaro to Treviso	305.6 km (190 mi)	Plain stage	Alfredo Binda (ITA)	Alfredo Binda (ITA)
13	2 June	Treviso to Trieste	208.2 km (129 mi)	Plain stage	Giovanni Brunero (ITA)	Alfredo Binda (ITA)
14	4 June	Trieste to Verona	275.6 km (171 mi)	Plain stage	Alfredo Binda (ITA)	Alfredo Binda (ITA)
15	6 June	Verona to Milan	291.5 km (181 mi)	Stage with mountain(s)	Alfredo Binda (ITA)	Alfredo Binda (ITA)
	Total		3,758.3 km (2,335 mi)			

=== General classification ===
There were 80 cyclists who had completed all fifteen stages. For these cyclists, the times they had needed in each stage was added up for the general classification. There was a time bonus for stage winners: the winner of a stage had one minute subtracted from their time. The cyclist with the least accumulated time was the winner. Aristide Cavallini won the prize for best ranked independent rider in the general classification.

Final general classification (1–10)
Rank	Name	Team	Time
1	Alfredo Binda (ITA)	Legnano-Pirelli	144h 15' 35"
2	Giovanni Brunero (ITA)	Legnano-Pirelli	+ 27' 24"
3	Antonio Negrini (ITA)	Wolsit	+ 36' 06"
4	Ermanno Vallazza (ITA)	Legnano-Pirelli	+ 51' 20"
5	Giuseppe Pancera (ITA)	Berrettini	+ 54' 29"
6	Arturo Bresciani (ITA)	Bianchi	+ 1h 10' 03"
7	Egidio Picchiottino (ITA)	Bianchi	+ 1h 11' 54"
8	Aleardo Simoni (ITA)	Ganna	+ 1h 32' 14"
9	Luigi Giacobbe (ITA)	Wolsit	+ 1h 57' 49"
10	Aristide Cavallini (ITA)	—	+ 2h 05' 44"
