= Michele Orecchia =

Italian cyclist

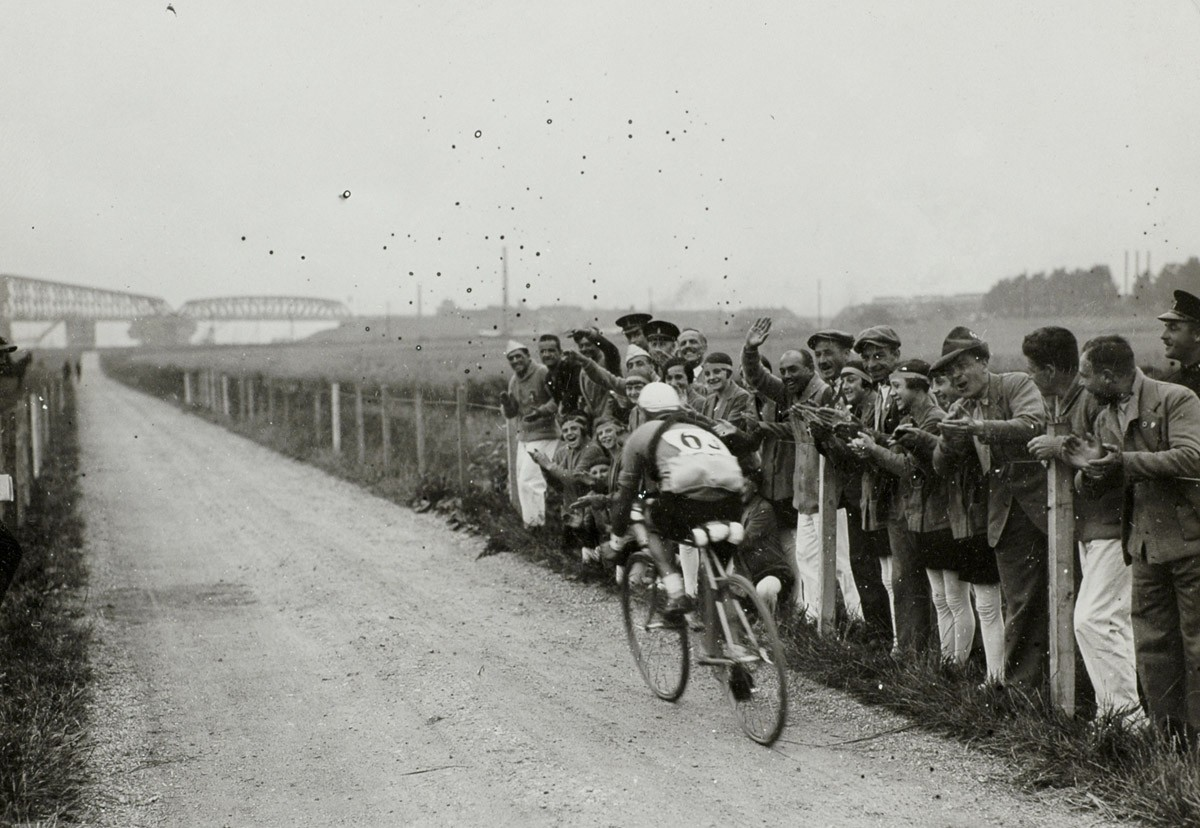

Personal information
- Full name: Michele Orecchia
- Born: 26 December 1903 Marseille, France
- Died: 18 November 1981 (aged 77) Moncalieri, Italy

Cycling career
- Sport: Cycling
- Discipline: Road
- Role: Rider

Major wins
- One stage 1932 Tour de France
Medal record
Representing Italy
Men's road bicycle racing
World Championships
Bronze medal – third place	1927 Nürburgring	Amateur's Road Race

Michele Orecchia (26 December 1903 – 18 November 1981) was an Italian professional road bicycle racer, who won one stage in the 1932 Tour de France. He also competed in the individual and team road race events at the 1928 Summer Olympics.

== Major results ==
1927
Giro del Sestriere
1929
Giro d'Italia:

9th place overall classification

1932
Tour de France:

Winner stage 8
