= Alfredo Binda =

Italian cyclist (1902–1986)

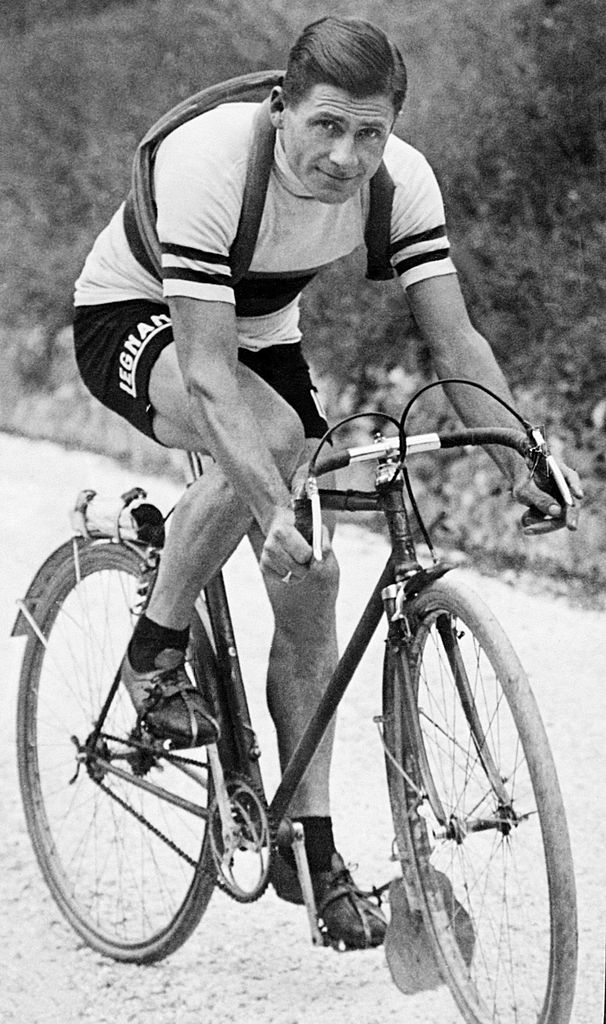

Personal information
- Full name: Alfredo Binda
- Nicknames: Gioconda; Trombettiere di Cittiglio (The Trumpeter of Cittiglio)
- Born: 11 August 1902 Cittiglio, Italy
- Died: 19 July 1986 (aged 83) Cittiglio, Italy

Cycling career
- Sport: Cycling
- Discipline: Road
- Role: Rider
- Rider type: Climber, classics specialist

Professional teams
- 1922: Nice Sport
- 1923–1924: La Française
- 1925–1927: Legnano
- 1928: Legnano/Mifa
- 1929–1936: Legnano

Major wins
- Grand Tours Tour de France 2 individual stages (1930) Giro d'Italia General classification (1925, 1927, 1928, 1929, 1933) Mountains classification (1933) 41 individual stages (1925–1929, 1931, 1933) One-day races and Classics World Road Race Championships (1927, 1930, 1932) National Road Race Championships (1926, 1927, 1928, 1929) Giro di Lombardia (1925, 1926, 1927, 1931) Milan–San Remo (1929, 1931) Giro del Piemonte (1926, 1927)
Medal record
Representing Italy
Men's road bicycle racing
World Championships
Gold medal – first place	1927 Nürburgring	Road race, elite
Bronze medal – third place	1929 Zürich	Road race, elite
Gold medal – first place	1930 Liège	Road race, elite
Gold medal – first place	1932 Rome	Road race, elite

Alfredo Binda (11 August 1902 – 19 July 1986) was an Italian road cyclist of the 1920s and 1930s. He was the first to win five editions of the Giro d'Italia, and a three-time world champion. In addition he won Milan–San Remo twice, and the Tour of Lombardy four times.

Later he would manage the Italian National team. Under him, Fausto Coppi, Gino Bartali and Gastone Nencini all triumphed at the Tour de France.

== Early life ==
Binda was born in Cittiglio near Varese but moved to Nice, in southern France as a teenager. He found work with his uncle as an apprentice plasterer, but he and brother Primo spent their free time cycling. He began racing in September 1921, aged 19. He won his first race (though he was subsequently disqualified) and it was clear from the outset that he was immensely gifted as both time trialist and climber.

Binda was a trained trumpet player, and was nicknamed "Trombettiere di Cittiglio" ("The Trumpeter of Cittiglio").

== Cycling career ==
Enticed by a 500 lire King of the Mountains prize on the Ghisallo climb, Binda rode from Nice to Milan in order to compete in the 1924 Tour of Lombardy. He won the prize, finished fourth in the race, and was immediately offered a contract with the Legnano professional team.

The 1925 Giro d'Italia was to be the last of the legendary campionissimo Costante Girardengo. All of Italy hoped he would prevail, and his defeat at the hands of Binda, a 23-year-old Giro debutant, was deeply unpopular. In the event Girardengo resolved to continue racing, and the two of them developed a caustic, deeply personal rivalry. As Girardengo's powers waned, Italians looked to Domenico Piemontesi to usurp Binda but, much like everyone else, he was hopelessly out of his depth against the fuoriclasse.

In 1929 Girardengo "discovered" a prodigiously strong track rider from Veneto, Learco Guerra. He famously anointed him as his heir apparent, a new "anti-Binda". Guerra closely resembled Girardengo as a cyclist, and was hugely popular. He enjoyed the support of the Italian Fascist Party, and by extension the press and wider sporting public. Binda, on the other hand, famously declared that he'd no interest in producing spettacolo. Rather he was simply in the business of winning bike races, and each time he defeated Guerra the Italian public's antipathy grew. Whilst Guerra was homespun, expansive and open, Binda was perceived as cold and detached, pompous even.

So dominant was he that the Gazzetta dello Sport offered him 22,500 lire to miss the Giro of 1930. Instead, he took part in that year's Tour de France, winning two stages. Not until 1932, when he won a third Cycling World Championship in Rome, did the public start to warm to him. By then he had redefined both training and racing methodology, and was arguably the greatest cyclist ever to have lived.

All told he won the Giro a record five times in 1925, 1927, 1928, 1929 and 1933 (1933 was also the first year the Giro held a "King of the Mountains" competition, which Binda won too). Besides the overall victories he won 41 stages (a record only broken in 2003 by Mario Cipollini). In 1927, he won 12 out of 15 stages, and in 1929 he won 8 consecutive stages.

In the World Championships, Binda was also very successful. He won the title three times in 1927, 1930 and 1932 (a record later equalled by Rik Van Steenbergen, Eddy Merckx, Óscar Freire and Peter Sagan). In addition, he placed third in 1929. By the time he retired he had won over 120 races, including the Italian Championships four times.

== Legacy ==
Società Ciclistica Alfredo Binda and the professional women's race Trofeo Alfredo Binda-Comune di Cittiglio are named in his honor.

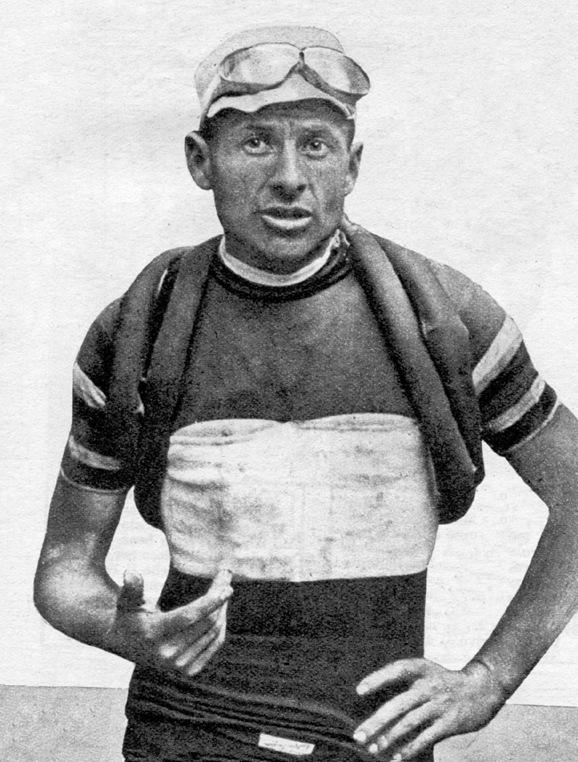
Binda at the 1927 Giro d'Italia

== Major results ==
1924
1st Overall Tour du Sud-Est

1st Stage 3

1st Mont Faron
4th Giro di Lombardia
1925
1st Overall Giro d'Italia

1st Stage 6

1st Giro di Lombardia
2nd Road race, National Road Championships
2nd Giro dell'Emilia
3rd Giro del Piemonte
1926
1st Road race, National Road Championships
1st Giro di Lombardia
1st Giro del Piemonte
1st Coppa Città di Milazzo
2nd Overall Giro d'Italia

1st Stages 3, 6, 7, 9, 11 & 12

2nd Giro del Veneto
3rd Giro della Romagna
1927
1st Road race, UCI Road World Championships
1st Road race, National Road Championships
1st Overall Giro d'Italia

1st Stages 1–3, 5–10, 12, 14 & 15 (Record for the Giro d'Italia)

1st Giro di Lombardia
1st Giro del Piemonte
2nd Milan–San Remo
2nd Giro dell'Emilia
1928
1st Road race, National Road Championships
1st Overall Giro d'Italia

1st Stages 2, 3, 4, 5, 10 & 11

1st Giro del Veneto
1st Rund um Köln
1st Predappio Alta - Roma
2nd Milan–San Remo
5th Groβer Sachsenpreis
1929
1st Road race, National Road Championships
1st Overall Giro d'Italia

1st Stages 2, 3, 4, 5, 6, 7, 8 & 9

1st Milan–San Remo
1st Giro della Romagna
1st Predappio Alta - Roma
2nd Giro del Piemonte
3rd Road race, UCI Road World Championships
1930
1st Road race, UCI Road World Championships
Tour de France

1st Stages 8 & 9

2nd Road race, National Road Championships
2nd Giro di Lombardia
2nd Giro di Toscana
1931
1st Milan–San Remo
1st Giro di Lombardia
Giro d'Italia

1st Stages 3 & 4

6th Road race, UCI Road World Championships
1932
1st Road race, UCI Road World Championships
1st GP Industria & Artigianato di Larciano
1st Giro della Provincia di Milano (with Raffaele di Paco)
2nd Milan–San Remo
2nd Giro di Campania
3rd Road race, National Road Championships
3rd Giro di Toscana
7th Overall Giro d'Italia
1933
1st Overall Giro d'Italia

1st Mountains classification
1st Stages 2, 8, 9, 10, 13 (ITT) & 17

6th Road race, UCI Road World Championships
6th Milan–San Remo

== See also ==
- Legends of Italian sport - Walk of Fame
