= Alessandro Catalani =

Italian cyclist

Personal information
- Born: 18 April 1905
- Died: 6 August 1986 (aged 81)

Cycling career
- Sport: Cycling
- Discipline: Road
- Role: Rider

Alessandro Catalani (18 April 1905 – 6 August 1986) was an Italian racing cyclist. He rode in the 1931 Tour de France.
