= Leonida Frascarelli =

Italian cyclist

Personal information
- Born: 21 February 1906 Rome, Italy
- Died: 18 June 1991 (aged 85)

Cycling career
- Sport: Cycling
- Role: Rider

Leonida Frascarelli (21 February 1906 – 18 June 1991) was an Italian racing cyclist. He won stages 2 and 14 of the 1930 Giro d'Italia.
