= Antonio Negrini =

Italian cyclist

Personal information
- Full name: Antonio Negrini
- Born: 28 January 1903 Molare, Italy
- Died: 25 September 1994 (aged 91) Molare, Italy

Cycling career
- Sport: Cycling

Antonio Negrini (28 January 1903 – 25 September 1994) was an Italian cyclist. He competed in two events at the 1924 Summer Olympics.
