= 1928 Giro d'Italia =

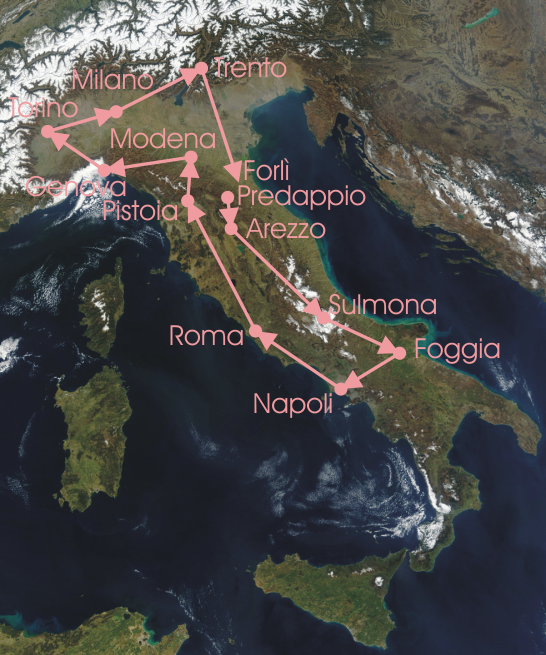
- Race Route

Race details
- Dates: 12 May – 3 June 1928
- Stages: 12
- Distance: 3,044.6 km (1,892 mi)
- Winning time: 114h 15' 19"

Results
	Winner	Alfredo Binda (ITA)	(Legnano)
	Second	Giuseppe Pancera (ITA)	(Touring-Pirelli)
	Third	Bartolomeo Aymo (ITA)	(Alcyon-Dunlop)

The 1928 Giro d'Italia was the 16th edition of the Giro d'Italia, organized and sponsored by the newspaper La Gazzetta dello Sport. The race began on 12 May in Milan with a stage that stretched 233.1 km (145 mi) to Trento, finishing back in Milan on 3 June after a 251 km (156 mi) stage and a total distance covered of 3,044.6 km (1,892 mi). The race was won by Alfredo Binda of the Legnano team. Second and third respectively were the Italian riders Giuseppe Pancera and Bartolomeo Aymo.

It was the edition with the highest number of participants (298), with 126 riders completing the race.

Once again Binda dominated the Giro, also winning 6 stages. Five stages were won by Domenico Piemontesi, who still didn't succeed in challenging Binda for the lead in the general classification.

The eighth stage was won by Albino Binda (Alfredo's brother and team-mate). Alfredo himself later admitted that he advised his brother to escape from the group the moment he stopped to change a tire (common operation before the introduction of derailleur gears).

== Participants ==
The 1928 Giro d'Italia had 365 entrants, of which 298 showed up at the start on 12 May, and 126 of them made it to the finish in Milan on 3 June. Riders were allowed to ride on their own or as a member of a team. There were seven teams that competed in the race: Alcyon-Hutchinson, Aliprandi-Pirelli, Atala-Pirelli, Bianchi-Pirelli, Diamant Continental, Touring Pirelli, and Wolsit Pirelli. In addition there were five groups that entered the race: Legione Ciclisti, U.S. Legnanese, Varese Sportiva, U.S. Viareggio, and U.S. Abbiatense.

The peloton was primarily composed of Italians. The field featured three former Giro d'Italia champions in three-time winner Giovanni Brunero, twice a winner and reigning champion Alfredo Binda, and single-time winner Giuseppe Enrici. Other notable Italian riders that started the race included Bartolomeo Aymo and Domenico Piemontesi.

== Race details ==
In the first stage, Piemontesi won with a small gap on Binda, and thus became the first race leader. Binda won the sprint of the second stage ahead of Piemontesi, and similarly in the third stage, but Piemontesi stayed leader.

In the fourth stage, Binda escaped and finished solo, minutes ahead of all other riders. Binda became the new race leader, with second-placed Giuseppe Pancera already more than ten minutes behind.

From then on, it was an easy race for Binda. He won four more stages, and his brother Albino Binda was also able to win stage. The remaining four stages were won by Piemontesi, but he was no threat for Binda in the general classification.

Positions in stages
Stage	1	2	3	4	5	6	7	8	9	10	11	12
Alfredo Binda	2	1	1	1	1	2	14	2	2	1	1	11
Piemontesi	1	2	2	6	2	1	1	46	1	2	2	1

Binda and Piemontesi were dominant stage results: together they won 11 out of 12 stages, and they took the first two spots eight times. Piemontesi finished the 1928 Giro in the 20th place in the general classification, more than two hours behind Binda; most of his time was lost in the eighth stage.

== Final standings ==
=== Stage results ===
Stage results
Stage	Date	Course	Distance	Type (Note: In 1928, there was no distinction in the rules between plain stages and mountain stages; the icons shown here indicate that the first, second, third, fourth, fifth, sixth, eighth, ninth, tenth, eleventh, and twelfth stages included major mountains.)	Winner	Race Leader
1	12 May	Milan to Trento	233.1 km (145 mi)	Stage with mountain(s)	Domenico Piemontesi (ITA)	Domenico Piemontesi (ITA)
2	14 May	Trento to Forlì	312.6 km (194 mi)	Stage with mountain(s)	Alfredo Binda (ITA)	Domenico Piemontesi (ITA)
3	16 May	Predappio to Arezzo	148 km (92 mi)	Stage with mountain(s)	Alfredo Binda (ITA)	Domenico Piemontesi (ITA)
4	18 May	Arezzo to Sulmona	327.9 km (204 mi)	Stage with mountain(s)	Alfredo Binda (ITA)	Alfredo Binda (ITA)
5	20 May	Sulmona to Foggia	254.6 km (158 mi)	Stage with mountain(s)	Alfredo Binda (ITA)	Alfredo Binda (ITA)
6	22 May	Foggia to Naples	248.3 km (154 mi)	Stage with mountain(s)	Domenico Piemontesi (ITA)	Alfredo Binda (ITA)
7	24 May	Naples to Rome	275 km (171 mi)	Plain stage	Domenico Piemontesi (ITA)	Alfredo Binda (ITA)
8	26 May	Rome to Pistoia	323 km (201 mi)	Stage with mountain(s)	Albino Binda (ITA)	Alfredo Binda (ITA)
9	28 May	Pistoia to Modena	206 km (128 mi)	Stage with mountain(s)	Domenico Piemontesi (ITA)	Alfredo Binda (ITA)
10	30 May	Modena to Genoa	270 km (168 mi)	Stage with mountain(s)	Alfredo Binda (ITA)	Alfredo Binda (ITA)
11	1 June	Genoa to Turin	195.1 km (121 mi)	Stage with mountain(s)	Alfredo Binda (ITA)	Alfredo Binda (ITA)
12	3 June	Turin to Milan	251 km (156 mi)	Stage with mountain(s)	Domenico Piemontesi (ITA)	Alfredo Binda (ITA)
	Total		3,044.6 km (1,892 mi)			

=== General classification ===
There were 126 cyclists who had completed all twelve stages. For these cyclists, the times they had needed in each stage was added up for the general classification. The cyclist with the least accumulated time was the winner. Alessandro Catalani won the prize for best ranked independent rider in the general classification.

Final general classification (1–10)
Rank	Name	Team	Time
1	Alfredo Binda (ITA)	Wolsit	114h 15' 19"
2	Giuseppe Pancera (ITA)	Touring	+ 18' 13"
3	Bartolomeo Aymo (ITA)	Alcyon	+ 27' 25"
4	Victor Fontan (FRA)	Wolsit	+ 31' 30"
5	Egidio Picchiottino (ITA)	Alcyon	+ 36' 23"
6	Aristide Cavallini (ITA)	Bianchi	+ 40' 34"
7	Amulio Viarengo (ITA)	Bianchi	+ 52' 19"
8	Albino Binda (ITA)	Wolsit	+ 54' 53"
9	Giovanni Brunero (ITA)	Wolsit	+ 1h 13' 00"
10	Pietro Chesi (ITA)	Bianchi	+ 1h 14' 07"
