= Domenico Piemontesi =

Italian cyclist (1903–1987)

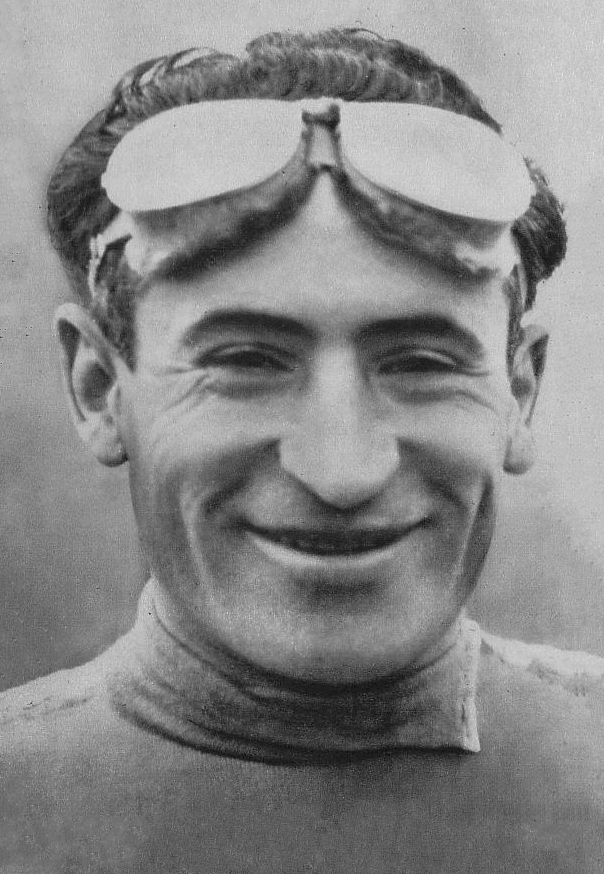
- Domenico Piemontesi c. 1937

Personal information
- Born: 11 January 1903 Boca, Italy
- Died: 31 May 1987 (aged 84) Borgomanero, Italy

Sport
- Sport: Cycling
- Event: Road
Medal record
Representing Italy
Men's road bicycle racing
World Championships
Bronze medal – third place	1927 Nürburgring	Elite

Domenico Piemontesi (11 January 1903 – 31 May 1987) was an Italian professional road bicycle racer. He is most known for his 12-stage wins in the Giro d'Italia and a bronze medal at the 1927 World Championships.

== Victories ==
1922 – Gloria
1923 – Atala
1924 – Ancora
1925 – Ancora
Coppa Giubileo
Trofeo Morgagni-Ridolfi
1926 – Alcyon-Dunlop
Giro del Piemonte
Stages 1 & 2, Giro d'Italia
1927 – Bianchi
Giro dell'Emilia
Milano-Modena
Stage 4, Giro d'Italia
(bronze) World Road Race Championship
1928 – Bianchi
Stages 1, 6, 7, 9 & 12, Giro d'Italia
Sachsen Tour
1929 – Bianchi
Stage 12, Giro d'Italia
1930 – Bianchi
Stage 5, Giro d'Italia
1931 – Bianchi
1932 – Génial Lucifer
Tre Valli Varesine
Trofeo Morgagni-Ridolfi
Stages 3 & 5, Volta a Catalunya
1933 – Génial Lucifer
Giro di Lombardia
1934 – Maino-Clement
Giro della Provincia de Milano (with Learco Guerra)
Circuit des Nations
Stage 1, Tour de Suisse
1935 – Maino-Girardengo
Stage 2, Giro d'Italia
1936 – Bianchi
1937 – Bianchi
1938 – Bianchi
