= Giuseppe Pancera =

Italian cyclist (1901–1977)

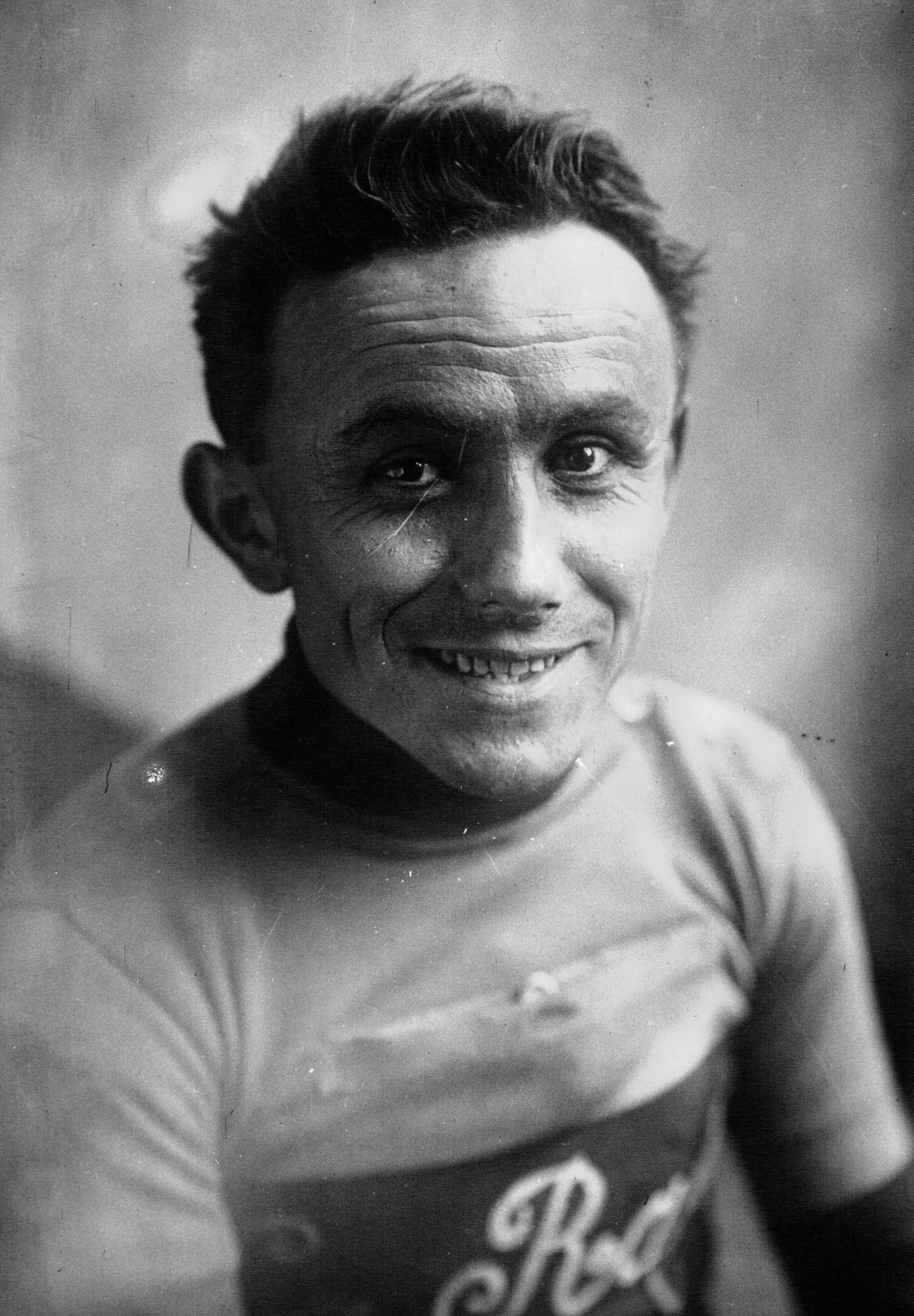

Personal information
- Full name: Giuseppe Pancera
- Born: 10 January 1901 Sona, Italy
- Died: 19 April 1977 (aged 76) Castelnuovo del Garda, Italy

Cycling career
- Sport: Cycling
- Discipline: Road
- Role: Rider

Major wins
- 2nd place 1928 Giro d'Italia; 2nd place 1929 Tour de France

Giuseppe Pancera (10 January 1901, in Sona – 19 April 1977, in Castelnuovo del Garda) was an Italian professional road bicycle racer. He won second place in both the 1928 Giro d'Italia and the 1929 Tour de France.

== Palmarès ==
1926
Coppa Bernocchi
Coppa d'Inverno
Criterium d'apertura
1927
Coppa Bernocchi
Roma-Napoli-Roma
Giro d'Italia:

5th place overall classification

1928
Giro d'Italia:

2nd place overall classification

1929
Tour de France:

2nd place overall classification
