= List of teams and cyclists in the 1913 Giro d'Italia =

The 1913 Giro d'Italia was the fifth edition of the Giro d'Italia, one of cycling's Grand Tours. The field consisted of 99 riders, and 35 of them finished the race. With the exception of the Swiss rider Emile Guyon, all the riders were Italian.

Legend
No.	Starting number worn by the rider during the Giro
Pos.	Position in the general classification
DNF	Denotes a rider who did not finish

No.	Name
1	Giovanni Gerbi
2	Giovanni Cervi
3	Giovanni Rossignoli
4	Giuseppe Contesini
5	Emanuele Cucchetti
6	Carlo Galetti
7	Vincenzo Borgarello
8	Eberardo Pavesi
9	Pierino Albini
10	Clemente Canepari
11	Ugo Agostoni
12	Carlo Oriani
13	Leopoldo Toricelli
14	Lauro Bordin
15	Costante Girardengo
17	Giuseppe Azzini
18	Luigi Azzini
19	Cesare Brambilla
20	Giovanni Cocchi
21	Dario Beni
22	Carlo Durando
23	Angelo Gremo
24	Giuseppe Santhià
25	Emanuele Garda
26	Ezio Corlaita
27	Enrico Verde
28	Luigi Annoni
29	Emilio Chironi
30	Luigi Ganna
32	Giuseppe Bosco
33	Natale Bosco
34	Pietro Aymo
35	Camillo Bertarelli
36	Giovanni Ripamonti
37	Luigi Lucotti
39	Albino Finardi
40	Augusto Rho
41	Mario Secchi
42	Angelo Erba
43	Enrico Sala
44	Giovanni Casetta
46	Ottavio Pratesi
48	Giovanni Marchese
49	Mansueto Cantoni
50	Vincenzo Morlotti
51	Mario Bonalanza
52	Alfredo Sivocci
53	Antonio Buelli
54	Michele Robotti
55	Assuero Barlottini
56	Emilio Pagani
57	Rinaldo Spinelli
58	Giovanni Barzisa
59	Gino Zanchetta
60	Mario Lonati
61	Gino Brizzi
62	Telesforo Benaglia
63	Mario Santagostini
64	Guido Dansi
65	Dante Ricci
66	Emile Guyon
67	Luigi Pellegrini
69	Antonio De Michiel
70	Riccardo Palea
71	Luigi Molon
73	Celidonio Morini
74	Cesare Zini
75	Giulio Garibaldi
76	Emilio Petiva
77	Guglielmo Zanella
79	Fedele Dradi
80	Domenico Allasia
81	Giovanni Roncon
82	Francesco Di Gennaro
83	Alfredo Corti
85	Armando Cantoni
86	Giosue Lombardi
87	Giuseppe Empolini
88	Giovanni Bassi
89	Giuseppe Bonfanti
90	Mario Marangoni
91	Luigi Rotta
92	Tranquillo Rotta
93	Paolo Turner
94	Iser
95	Domenico Cittera
96	Lorenzo Saccone
98	Guido Vercellino
99	Pierino Alberini
100	Luigi Castelletti
101	L. Bernazzani
103	Alfredo Jacobini
105	Giovanni Bartolozzi
108	Edoardo Bardelli
109	Emilio Brenna
110	Oreste Locatelli
111	Gaetano Bacci
112	Luigi Capra
113	Antonio Rotondi
