= 1914 Giro d'Italia =

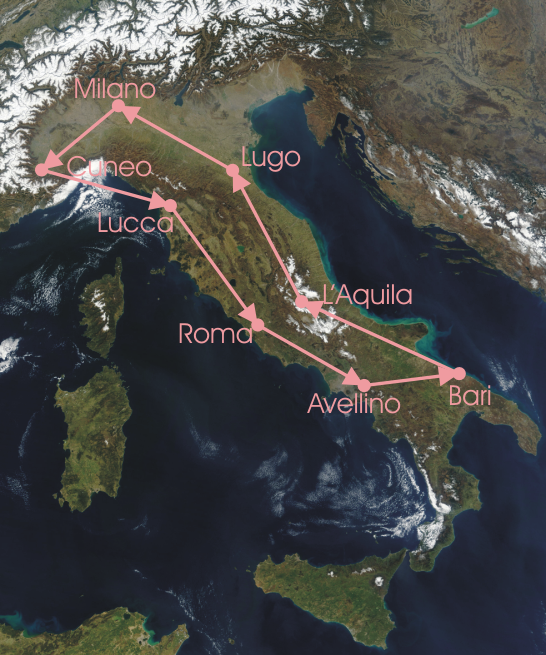
- Race Route

Race details
- Dates: 24 May – 7 June 1914
- Stages: 8
- Distance: 3,162 km (1,965 mi)
- Winning time: 135h 17' 56"

Results
	Winner	Alfonso Calzolari (ITA)	(Stucchi)
	Second	Pierino Albini (ITA)	(Globo-Dunlop)
	Third	Luigi Lucotti (ITA)	(Maino)
	Team	Stucchi - Dunlop	

The 1914 Giro d'Italia was the sixth Giro; it was organised and sponsored by the newspaper La Gazzetta dello Sport. The race began on 24 May in Milan with a stage that stretched 420 km (261 mi) to Cuneo, finishing back in Milan on 6 June after a 420.3 km (261 mi) stage and a total distance covered of 3,162 km (1,965 mi). The race was won by the Italian rider Alfonso Calzolari of the Stucchi team. Second and third respectively were the Italian riders Pierino Albini and Luigi Lucotti.

It was the last Giro before the Great War and the first one with a final classification based on time rather than points.

It is remembered as the hardest Giro of the heroic period of bicycle racing. Besides five stages of over 400 km (and the longest ever average stage length), it included the longest stage ever in the history of the Giro: the Lucca–Rome stage won by Costante Girardengo. This edition of the Giro was run at the lowest average speed (23.374 km/h); marked the highest gap between the first and the second (1 hour, 55 minutes and 26 seconds); saw the longest ever stage by time taken (the Bari–L'Aquila). Only 8 riders (out of 81 participants) finished the race.

The sixth stage (Bari–L'Aquila) is remembered as the hardest stage in the history of the Giro, with many riders forced to retire, including the first of the general classification Giuseppe Azzini, who was found the next day resting in a country house.

The Giro organisation declared Calzolari winner after the race, but a legal battle started between the Giro organisation and the Italian Cycling Union, who thought Calzolari should have been removed from the race for taking help from a car, making Albini the winner. After 14 months in court, the final decision was in favor of the Giro organisation, thus making Calzolari the definitive winner.

== Participants ==
Before the race started, 98 cyclists had entered themselves in the race, of which 35 were professional cyclists in a team, 41 were professional cyclists without a team, and 22 were amateurs (Italian: aspiranti). Favorites for the race were Lucien Petit-Breton from France, and Ganna, Galetti, Girardengo, Giuseppe Santhià and Azzini from Italy. There was no fixed number for cyclists per team; teams could decide for themselves how many riders to enter. Bianchi sent eight riders, while Stucchi and Globo only sent four.

Race director Cougnet decided to allow amateurs due to the low number of cyclists and teams that had registered in the weeks prior to the start. Many of these riders were unemployed and borrowed bikes in order to participate. Umberto Ripamonti was the youngest to enter the race at age nineteen.

At 24 May, when the Giro began, 81 of them started the race; only eight of them made it to the finish in Milan on 7 June. Riders were allowed to ride on their own or as a member of a team. There were eight teams that competed in the race: Alcyon, Atala, Bianchi, Ganna, Gerbi, Globo, Maino, and Stucchi. The field featured three former Giro d'Italia champions in the 1909 winner Luigi Ganna, three-time winner Carlo Galetti, Eberardo Pavesi who was a member of the 1912 Atala winning team, and returning champion Carlo Oriani. Other notable Italian riders that started the race included Costante Girardengo, Angelo Gremo, Alfonso Calzolari, and Giovanni Gerbi.

== Race summary ==
The race itself began at midnight along the Corso Sempione in Milan. Rain began quickly after the riders started. Angelo Gremo won the first stage ahead of Carlo Durando and Alfonso Calzolari who finished over thirteen minutes in arrears. After those three finishers, 34 more crossed the line with the last rider finishing seven hours after Calzolari. Only three aspiranti riders remained. Three riders were disqualified for being pulled by cars, which meant that half of the cyclists were already out of the race after the first stage. All non-Italian starters did not finish the first stage of which British rider Freddie Grubb withdrew after around 11 hours of racing because of mechanicals he stated were from Italian competitors.

In an early stage, nails were thrown on to the route and forced many punctures and led to many abandonments. The organizers offered a reward of 1,000 lire to find the culprit.

Calzolari won the second stage, leaving all other riders so far behind that he took the lead. He stayed safe in the third stage. In that third stage, Lauro Bordin escaped after 15 km, and rode alone for 350 km, which made it the longest (unsuccessful) breakaway in the history of the Giro.

Calzolari seemed to be the strongest rider, and was at that point expected to win. From then on, Calzolari's tires started to puncture more than normal. Sometimes at a checkpoint where riders had to place their signatures, or when they had to carry their bicycles. In this way, Calzolari's competition won back some time in the fourth stage, which was won by Giuseppe Azzini, with a margin of over 36 minutes. The fifth stage was also won by Giuseppe Azzini as it poured rain over the finish of the race, this time more than an hour ahead of the next cyclist. This is the biggest stage-winning margin in Giro history, a record that is practically impossible to be broken. Azzini had won back enough time to lead the general classification, and was announced as new leader. Later that evening, he was given a penalty of one minute for taking a shortcut, which would have put him back in second place. Due to unclarity about when this penalty should take effect, he is often still regarded as leader after the fifth stage.

Calzolari was accused of having been pulled by a car during stage 5 or 6. Previously riders had been expelled from the race for this infraction, but the jury decided to give Calzolari a time penalty of three hours. Bianchi and Globo accused Calzolari and his teammates Durando and Canepari of being towed by a red car up the climb of the Svolte. A Bologna-based newspaper Il Resto del Carlino published an article positing rumors that the three riders actually got in the car and were driven to the top of the climb. While being aided by the red car, a race official drove up and passed the riders. In front of the race jury Canepari stated the trio only held on for roughly 100m. When asked who drove the car, Canepari replied "Oh, some friend of Alfonzo's." Calzolari denied holding on to the car, while stating his two teammates held on after being asked to by the operator of the car. The jury found them guilty and awarded them the same time of the last finisher of the stage, Luigi Lucotti who finished three hours and twenty-two minutes down.

The next stage, stage 6, is regarded as the toughest stage in the Giro ever. It was very long, and the weather was terrible. Giuseppe Azzini did not finish this stage; he had last been seen 30 km from the finish. The organisation started a search for Azzini, who was found the next morning, in a barn miles off the route with a fever. Azzini was taken to a hospital and recovered quickly, but did not continue the race and took the train home. Newspapers reported he had broncho-pneumonia, but Paolo Facchinetti later stated he felt it was from overuse of the drug strychnine Because Azzini had not finished the stage, this was the first time in Giro history that the winner of a stage did not finish the next stage. Carlo Oriani also abandoned in that stage, which meant that there was no longer any previous Giro winner in the race. Calzolari stayed in the race, and he led the race again by a margin of two hours.

The seventh leg started in L'Aquila. Following Azzini's departure the remaining two riders of the Bianchi team withdrew from the race before the day's start, leaving ten riders. Before the start, the Italian Cycling Union had telegrammed to invalidate the race if the three cheating riders started the stage; however, the message was not received by the organizers in time and the race started. There is speculation that the start was rushed that morning to allow for the race to continue. The riders stayed together for most of the stage, until Durando became sick during the stage and stopped to throw up, only to have to ride the remaining 300k alone after teammate Giosue Lombardi initially slowed to help pace him back, only to have Durando refuse the help and tell him to return to the front. The group rode on until Calzolari had a flat tire, but the remaining eight slowed their pace to allow him to rejoin. Later isolati rider Maggiore Albani suffered a flat, but was left behind by the group and eventually abandoned. Lombardi withdrew after passing Pesaro and having rejoined the group due to exhaustion.

The eighth stage finished in the Sempione open-air velodrome where Albini again won a sprint. By winning the race, Calzolari won 3,000 lire.

Calzolari did not get into any more problems in the last two stages, and thereby won the 1914 Giro d'Italia.

== Final standings ==
The race compared to the previous year's had fewer stages and a greater total distance. The route covered the whole stretch of the country from northwest to southeast in Bari. The stages in the 1914 Giro were unusually long; stages 1, 3, 6, 7 and 8 are the longest five in the history of the Giro d'Italia, each over 420 km. Race director Armando Cougnet decided to abandon the points system for calculating the general classification in favor of a purely time-based approach where the leader was the rider with the lowest total time raced for all stages – a decision the Tour de France director Henri Desgrange had made in 1913. The prize for winning the race in 1914 was 3,000 lire.

=== Stage results ===
Stage results
Stage	Date	Course	Distance	Type (Note: In 1914, there was no distinction in the rules between plain stages and mountain stages; the icons shown here indicate that the first, third, fourth, fifth, sixth, seventh, and eighth stages included major mountains.)	Winner	Race Leader
1	24 May	Milan to Cuneo	420 km (261 mi)	Stage with mountain(s)	Angelo Gremo (ITA)	Angelo Gremo (ITA)
2	26 May	Cuneo to Lucca	340.5 km (212 mi)	Plain stage	Alfonso Calzolari (ITA)	Alfonso Calzolari (ITA)
3	28 May	Lucca to Rome	430 km (267 mi)	Stage with mountain(s)	Costante Girardengo (ITA)	Alfonso Calzolari (ITA)
4	30 May	Rome to Avellino	365.4 km (227 mi)	Stage with mountain(s)	Giuseppe Azzini (ITA)	Alfonso Calzolari (ITA)
5	1 June	Avellino to Bari	328.7 km (204 mi)	Stage with mountain(s)	Giuseppe Azzini (ITA)	Giuseppe Azzini (ITA)
6	3 June	Bari to L'Aquila	428 km (266 mi)	Stage with mountain(s)	Luigi Lucotti (ITA)	Alfonso Calzolari (ITA)
7	5 June	L'Aquila to Lugo	429.1 km (267 mi)	Stage with mountain(s)	Pierino Albini (ITA)	Alfonso Calzolari (ITA)
8	7 June	Lugo to Milan	420.3 km (261 mi)	Stage with mountain(s)	Pierino Albini (ITA)	Alfonso Calzolari (ITA)
	Total		3,162 km (1,965 mi)			

=== General classification ===
Eight cyclists who completed all eight stages. For these cyclists, the times they had needed in each stage was added up for the general classification. The cyclist with the lowest total was the winner. Enrico Sala won the prize for best-ranked isolati rider in the general classification.

Final general classification (1–8)
Rank	Name	Team	Time
1	Alfonso Calzolari (ITA)	Stucchi	135h 17′ 56″
2	Pierino Albini (ITA)	Globo	+ 1h 57′ 26″"
3	Luigi Lucotti (ITA)	Maino	+ 2h 04′ 23″
4	Clemente Canepari (ITA)	Stucchi	+ 3h 01′ 12″
5	Enrico Sala (ITA)	—	+ 3h 59′ 45″
6	Carlo Durando (ITA)	Maino	+ 5h 12′ 12″
7	Ottavio Pratesi (ITA)	Alcyon	+ 9h 34′ 47″
8	Umberto Ripamonti (ITA)	—	+ 17h 21′ 08″

Of the two cyclists without a team, Sala rode as a professional Italian: isolato and Ripamonti as an amateur Italian: aspirante. The winning team was Stucchi.

== Aftermath ==
During the race, Calzolari, Canepari and Durando had been given a penalty of 3 hours, for taking help from a car. After the race, the Italian Cycling Union said that the Giro jury had made a wrong decision, and that the three cyclists should have been removed from the race, declaring Albini the winner. The Giro organisation did not agree, and declared that Calzolari stayed the winner. The two parties went to court, and in February 1915 the Giro organisation won, and again after an appeal in July 1915, making Calzolari the definitive winner.

When the riders crossed the finish line in Milan, their appearance was worn, some appeared "emaciated", and several had wounds from recent crashes. Writers for newspapers condemned the route and conditions, saying that the organisers had no right to call this inhuman spectacle a success. One wrote "An event that seeks to destroy its comepetitors has no place in this sport." Meanwhile La Gazzetta dello Sporta stated "An army left Milan; only a brave patrol has returned."

Several weeks after the 1914 Giro ended, World War I started. Italy initially stayed neutral, but Italy entered the war in early 1915, which made it impossible to organize a Giro in the next years, and the planned 1915 edition was cancelled. Lucien Petit-Breton, who raced in this edition but abandoned, was killed during the war.

The 1914 Giro has since been regarded as the hardest Grand Tour of all time. It set many records that are unlikely to be broken due to how the race has changed since. These include the edition with the fewest finishers (eight) and the highest percentage of abandoned riders (90%). As mentioned above, it included five of the longest stages in the history of the Giro d'Italia, of which the third stage from Lucca to Rome 430 km (267 mi) was the longest ever and the race itself had the highest-ever average stage length of 396.25 km (246 mi). The sixth stage holds the record for the longest individual stage by time at 19h 34′ 47″.

Due to the race's reputation, British author Tim Moore rode the route in autumn of 2012. He elected to ride the course in period attire and on a period bicycle; then publishing a book about it titled Gironimo! Riding the Very Terrible 1914 Tour of Italy.

Paolo Facchinetti interviewed Calzolari in April 1972 for a book, Giro 1914, il più duro di tutti. Calzolari described the race, saying: "It was a massacre that only eight of us survived, and somehow, in spite of everything. I beat them all."
