= List of teams and cyclists in the 1920 Giro d'Italia =

The 1920 Giro d'Italia was the eighth edition of the Giro d'Italia, one of cycling's Grand Tours. The field consisted of 49 riders, and 10 riders finished the race.

Legend
No.	Starting number worn by the rider during the Giro

No.	Name	Nationality	Team
1	Costante Girardengo	Italy	
2	Alfonso Calzolari	Italy	
3	Giuseppe Santhià	Italy	
4	Heiri Suter	Switzerland	
6	Ezio Corlaita	Italy	
7	Clemente Canepari	Italy	
8	Luigi Annoni	Italy	
9	Gaetano Belloni	Italy	
10	Giuseppe Azzini	Italy	
11	Angelo Gremo	Italy	
12	Ugo Agostoni	Italy	
13	Giuseppe Oliveri	Italy	
14	Alfredo Sivocci	Italy	
15	Leopoldo Toricelli	Italy	
16	Giovanni Brunero	Italy	
17	Paride Ferrari	Italy	
18	Carlo Galetti	Italy	
19	Marcel Buysse	Belgium	
22	Jean Alavoine	France	
24	Giovanni Gerbi	Italy	Lone rider
26	Luigi Grecchi	Italy	Lone rider
27	Giovanni Roncon	Italy	Lone rider
28	Camillo Bertarelli	Italy	Lone rider
29	Francesco Di Gennaro	Italy	Lone rider
30	Lauro Bordin	Italy	Lone rider
31	Emilio Petiva	Italy	Lone rider
32	Nicolino Di Biase	Italy	Lone rider
33	Damiano Solitario	Italy	Lone rider
35	Angelo Marchi	Italy	Lone rider
36	Enrico Sala	Italy	Lone rider
37	Antonio Buelli	Italy	Lone rider
38	Ugo Ruggeri	Italy	Lone rider
40	Bartolomeo Aimo	Italy	Lone rider
41	Costante Costa	Italy	Lone rider
43	Ugo Ripamonti	Italy	Lone rider
44	Giosue Lombardi	Italy	Lone rider
46	Maurizio Garino	Italy	Lone rider
48	Policarpo Fatutto	Italy	Lone rider
49	Lazzaro Bortoletto	Italy	Lone rider
50	Giovanni Garatti	Italy	Lone rider
51	Giovanni Rossignoli	Italy	Lone rider
52	Rinaldo Spinelli	Italy	Lone rider
53	Dino Bertolino	Italy	Lone rider
54	Domenico Schierano	Italy	Lone rider
55	Luigi Sannino	Italy	Lone rider
56	Francesco Cerutti	Italy	Lone rider
57	Giuseppe Lotteri	Italy	Lone rider
58	Galeazzo Bolzoni	Italy	Lone rider
59	Andrea Cazzaniga	Italy	Lone rider
