= 1915 Milan–San Remo =

Race details
- Dates: 28 March 1915
- Stages: 1
- Distance: 289 km (180 mi)
- Winning time: 10h 36' 03"

Results
	Winner	Ezio Corlaita (ITA)
	Second	Luigi Lucotti (ITA)
	Third	Angelo Gremo (ITA)

The 1915 Milan–San Remo was the ninth edition of the Milan–San Remo cycle race and was held on 28 March 1915. The race started in Milan and finished in San Remo. The race was won by Ezio Corlaita.

== General classification ==
Final general classification

Rank	Rider	Time
1	Ezio Corlaita (ITA)	10h 36' 03"
2	Luigi Lucotti (ITA)	+ 1' 07"
3	Angelo Gremo (ITA)	+ 6' 57"
4	Carlo Galetti (ITA)	+ 7' 07"
5	Giuseppe Azzini (ITA)	+ 8' 27"
6	Giovanni Cervi (ITA)	+ 17' 04"
7	Giovanni Rossignoli (ITA)	+ 25' 37"
8	Lauro Bordin (ITA)	+ 25' 37"
9	Ottavio Pratesi (ITA)	+ 25' 37"
10	Alfonso Calzolari (ITA)	+ 25' 37"
