= 1913 Giro d'Italia =

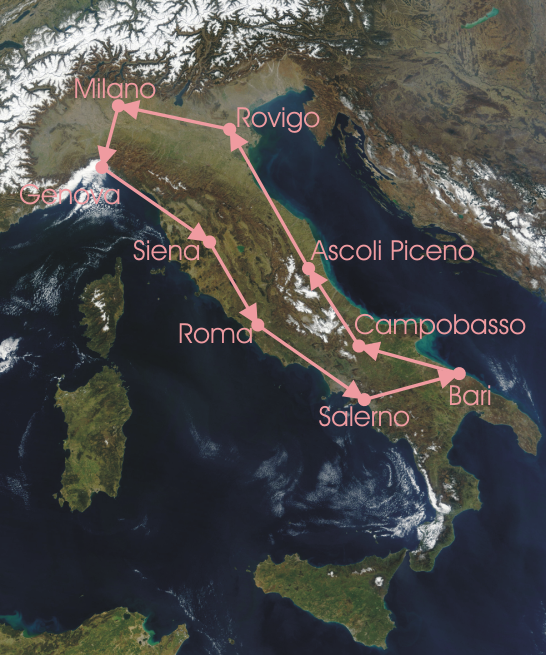
- Race Route

Race details
- Dates: 6–22 May 1913
- Stages: 9
- Distance: 2,932 km (1,822 mi)
- Winning time: 135h 15' 56"

Results
	Winner	Carlo Oriani (ITA)	(Maino)
	Second	Eberardo Pavesi (ITA)	(Legnano)
	Third	Giuseppe Azzini (ITA)	(OTAV)
	Team	Maino	

The 1913 Giro d'Italia was the fifth edition of the Giro d'Italia, a Grand Tour organized and sponsored by the newspaper La Gazzetta dello Sport. The race began on 6 May in Milan with a stage that stretched 341 km (212 mi) to Genoa, finishing back in Milan on 22 May after a 321.1 km (200 mi) stage and a total distance covered of 2,932 km (1,822 mi). The race was won by the Italian rider Carlo Oriani of the Maino team. Second and third respectively were the Italian riders Eberardo Pavesi and Giuseppe Azzini.

It was the last Giro with a final classification in points and the first one in which the final winner of the race did not win a single stage. The Giro saw the debut of the twenty-year-old Costante Girardengo, who won the 6th stage. The 1913 Giro was the last concluded by Luigi Ganna, winner of the first edition.

== Changes from the 1912 Giro d'Italia ==
Outside the yearly changes in the route, race length, and number of stages, the biggest change to how the general classification was to be calculated. The race organizers decided to change back to the way the general classification had been calculated in the earlier editions, by the individual and the awarding of points based on how high the rider placed in each stage rather than doing a team points based system like the previous edition.

== Participants ==
Of the 99 riders that began the Giro d'Italia on 6 May, 35 of them made it to the finish in Milan on 22 May. Riders were allowed to ride on their own or as a member of a team. There were eight teams that competed in the race: Ganna-Dunlop, Gerbi-Dunlop, Globo-Dunlop, Legnano-Dunlop, Maino-Pirelli, Otav-Pirelli, Peugeot Italy-Tedeschi, and Stucchi-Dunlop.

The peloton was composed completely of Italians. The field featured three former Giro d'Italia champions in the 1909 winner Luigi Ganna, three-time winner and returning champion Carlo Galetti, and returning champion Eberardo Pavesi. Other notable Italian riders that started the race included Giovanni Rossignoli, Alfredo Sivocci, Carlo Oriani, and Giuseppe Azzini.

Among the riders was Edoardo Bardelli, who had recently turned seventeen. Bardelli is the youngest rider to have started the Giro d'Italia.

== Race details ==
The first stage ended with a sprint between Santhia and Albini; Santhia won and became the first leader.

In the second stage, Pavesi suffered from a flat tire, but he was able to get back to the peloton, and then get away from the other riders, finishing alone. Albini became the new leader.

In the third stage, a large group stayed together until the last checkpoint in Narni. There, the soigneurs of the Legnano cycling team (with Borgarello, Albini, Pavesi, Albini and Canepari) had not arrived yet, so they could not get their foods and drinks. Santhia and Azzini saw an opportunity and escaped; when Azzini had a flat tire, Santhia continued alone, and won the stage, becoming the leader of the general classification.

Stage four was won by Giuseppe Azzini, in his first year as a professional cyclist. Santhia finished in third place, keeping the overall lead.

Azzini also won the fifth stage. An important event in that stage was a late flat tire for Santhia. Because of his low position in the stage, he lost the overall lead to Pavesi.

In the sixth stage, Santhia abandoned because he was ill. A young Costante Girardengo won this stage, the first of 30 stage victories in the Giro.

The seventh stage was won by Canepari, in a long solo escape. Pavesi finished the stage in twelfth place, and lost the lead to Azzini, who was only one point ahead of Oriani.

The eighth stage ended in a sprint. Only the first seven riders could be ranked by the jury, the rest was put ex aequo on the eighth place. Bordin won the sprint, with Oriani in second place; this was enough for Oriani to become the new leader in the general classification.

The only rider who could take the overall victory away from Oriani was Azzini. Midway in the stage, Oriani had a flat tire. He changed a wheel with his team mate Agostoni, and had to chase the main group (including Azzini). Azzini rode hard to stay away from Oriani, but Oriano was able to get back to Azzini's group, and when he saw that Azzini was tired, he immediately rode away. Some riders followed him, but Azzini was not able to follow. Oriani's escape group stayed away until the finish, and Oriani thus won the Giro.

== Final standings ==
=== Stage results ===
Stage results
Stage	Date	Course	Distance	Type (Note: In 1913, there was no distinction in the rules between plain stages and mountain stages; the icons shown here indicate that the first, second, third, fourth, fifth, sixth, seventh, and ninth stages included major mountains.)	Winner	Race Leader
1	6 May	Milan to Genoa	341 km (212 mi)	Stage with mountain(s)	Giuseppe Santhià (ITA)	Giuseppe Santhià (ITA)
2	8 May	Genoa to Siena	332 km (206 mi)	Stage with mountain(s)	Eberardo Pavesi (ITA)	Pierino Albini (ITA)
3	10 May	Siena to Rome	317.9 km (198 mi)	Stage with mountain(s)	Giuseppe Santhià (ITA)	Giuseppe Santhià (ITA)
4	12 May	Rome to Salerno	341 km (212 mi)	Stage with mountain(s)	Giuseppe Azzini (ITA)	Giuseppe Santhià (ITA)
5	14 May	Salerno to Bari	295.6 km (184 mi)	Stage with mountain(s)	Giuseppe Azzini (ITA)	Eberardo Pavesi (ITA)
6	16 May	Bari to Campobasso	256 km (159 mi)	Stage with mountain(s)	Costante Girardengo (ITA)	Eberardo Pavesi (ITA)
7	18 May	Campobasso to Ascoli Piceno	313.2 km (195 mi)	Stage with mountain(s)	Clemente Canepari (ITA)	Giuseppe Azzini (ITA)
8	20 May	Ascoli Piceno to Rovigo	413.8 km (257 mi)	Plain stage	Lauro Bordin (ITA)	Carlo Oriani (ITA)
9	22 May	Rovigo to Milan	321.5 km (200 mi)	Stage with mountain(s)	Eberardo Pavesi (ITA)	Carlo Oriani (ITA)
	Total		2,932 km (1,822 mi)			

=== General classification ===
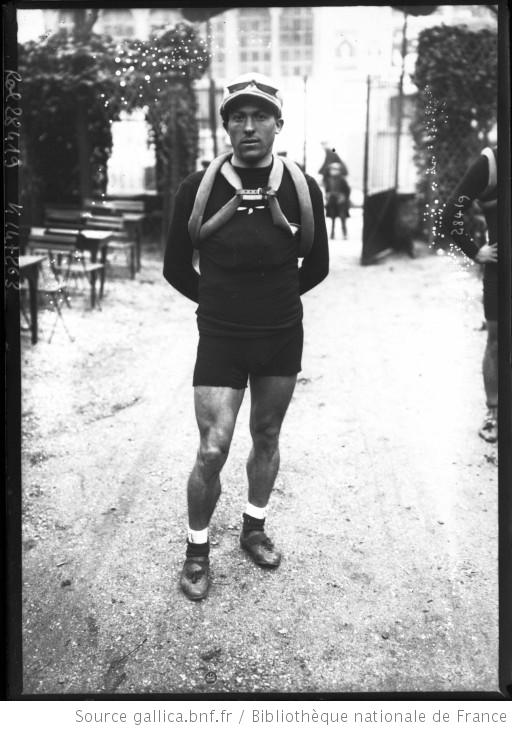
Carlo Oriani won the race after taking the lead upon the conclusion of the eighth leg.

There were 35 cyclists who had completed all nine stages. For these cyclists, the points they received from each of their stage placing's were added up for the general classification. The cyclist with the least accumulated points was the winner.

Final general classification (1–10)
Rank	Name	Team	Point
1	Carlo Oriani (ITA)	Maino	37
2	Eberardo Pavesi (ITA)	Legnano	43
3	Giuseppe Azzini (ITA)	Otav	48
4	Pierino Albini (ITA)	Legnano	61
5	Luigi Ganna (ITA)	Ganna	64
6	Costante Girardengo (ITA)	Maino	74
6	Leopoldo Torricelli (ITA)	Maino	74
8	Giuseppe Contesini (ITA)	Globo-Dunlop	81
9	Giovanni Cervi (ITA)	Gerbi-Dunlop	82
10	Giovanni Rossignoli (ITA)	Globo-Dunlop	89

Final general classification (11–34)
Rank	Name	Team	Point
11	Ugo Agostoni (ITA)	—	93
12	Clemente Canepari (ITA)	Legnano	97
13	Michele Robotti (ITA)	Ganna	99
14	Camillo Bertarelli (ITA)	Ganna	103
15	Emilio Petiva (ITA)	—	116
16	Luigi Lucotti (ITA)	—	120
17	Lauro Bordin (ITA)	—	123
18	Luigi Azzini (ITA)	Otav	127
19	Giovanni Cocchi (ITA)	Otav	130
20	Giovanni Casetta (ITA)	Goericke	131
21	Emilio Cucchetti (ITA)	Globo-Dunlop	132
22	Natale Bosco (ITA)	—	134
22	Gino Brizzi (ITA)	—	134
24	Domenico Cittera (ITA)	—	135
24	Alfredo Sivocci (ITA)	—	135
26	Luigi Molon (ITA)	—	138
26	Mario Bonalanza (ITA)	—	138
28	Giovanni Roncon (ITA)	—	139
29	Giuseppe Bonfanti (ITA)	—	143
30	Umberto Ripamonti (ITA)	—	147
31	Giovanni Bassi (ITA)	—	149
31	Oreste Locatelli (ITA)	—	149
33	Mario Secchi (ITA)	—	157
34	Alfredo Corti (ITA)	—	158
34	Mario Lonati (ITA)	—	158

=== Isolati rider classification ===
There was a classification for only the isolati riders that was called the "Premio Momo," it was calculated in the same manner as the general classification.

Final isolati classification (1–5)
Rank	Name	Team	Point
1	Michele Robotti (ITA)	Ganna	99
2	Camillo Bertarelli (ITA)	Ganna	103
3	Emilio Petiva (ITA)	—	116
4	Luigi Lucotti (ITA)	—	120
5	Giovanni Cassetta (ITA)	Goericke	131

=== Team classification ===
To be eligible for the team classification, known in Italian as the Premio dell'Industria, the team must have three riders complete the course. For each team that had at least the necessary three riders complete the race, the three riders with the lowest point totals from the team would be added together to give each team its score. The team with the lowest total of points was the winner of the classification.

Final team classification (1–4)
Rank	Team	Points
1	Maino	185
2	Legnano	201
3	Globo	302
4	Otav	305

== Aftermath ==
Upon winning the race, Carlo Oriani enlisted in the Corps of the Bersaglieri, the Italian infantry, and got commissioned into World War I. Oriani died in a military hospital in Casserta.

The 1913 Giro was considered successful; there were few irregularities, and all but two stages had successful escapes.
