= 1912 Giro d'Italia =

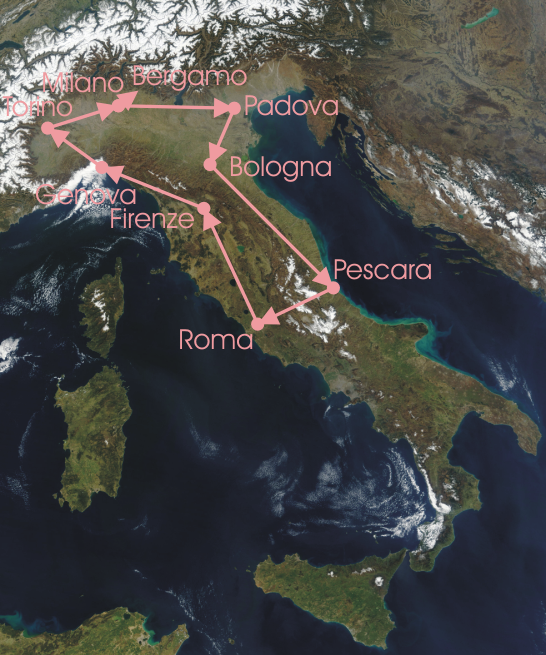
- Overview of the stages: route clockwise from Milan, down to Pescara, over to Rome, and up to Bergamo

Race details
- Dates: 19 May – 4 June 1912
- Stages: 9
- Distance: 2,439.6 km (1,515.9 mi)
- Winning time: 100h 02' 57"

Results
	Winner	Atala-Dunlop
	Second	Peugeot
	Third	Gerbi

The 1912 Giro d'Italia was the fourth edition of the Giro d'Italia, a Grand Tour set up and sponsored by the newspaper La Gazzetta dello Sport. The race began on 19 May in Milan with a stage that stretched 398.8 km (248 mi) to Padua. The race was composed of nine stages that covered a total distance of 2,733.6 km (1,699 mi). The race came to a close in Bergamo on 4 June after a 235 km (146 mi) stage. The race was won by the Atala-Dunlop team that finished with Carlo Galetti, Eberardo Pavesi, and Giovanni Micheletto. Second and third respectively were Peugeot and Gerbi.

The calculation of the general classification changed from the previous editions of the race, shifting to a team-based event, with each team only allowed four riders. Points were awarded to teams based upon winning the stage, having multiple riders in the top four places in each stage, and finishing the stage with a minimum of three riders. A total of fourteen teams participated, with 56 riders registering and 54 officially starting the race.

Micheletto won the opening stage of the race to give Atala-Dunlop the first lead in the race. Despite two consecutive stage wins by Legnano riders, Atala-Dunlop still retained the lead going into the fourth stage. The fourth leg was held in rainy conditions that caused some rivers to overflow on the course and riders to take the wrong roads for extensive distances; this led to the cancellation of the stage and addition of a ninth leg that drew some of its route from the Giro di Lombardia. An Atala-Dunlop rider won the fifth stage, but the team lost the lead to Peugeot for one stage. Following the stage, Atala-Dunlop regained the lead and held that to the race's finish in Bergamo.

== Changes from the 1911 Giro d'Italia ==
Outside the yearly changes in the route, race length, and number of stages, the biggest change was in how the general classification was to be calculated. The organizers chose to make the general classification centered on teams rather than individuals as the race was contested in the first three years of its existence. They chose to only allow teams of four riders to compete in the race, making this the first Giro d'Italia to not contain any independent riders. Each team was required to have three riders finish each stage in order to remain in the race. The general classification was still determined by a point system: four points went to the team that the stage winner came from, if a team got two riders in the top four placings on a stage they got two points, and if a team completed the stage with the minimum three riders, they earned one point.

The new point system for the general classification was met with some resistance as many people were very confused by how the new system operated or simply preferred the original system the organizers had used in years past. In response to the confusion surrounding the general classification format, the race organizers released a supplement to help better explain how the new points system operated. A La Stampa writer claimed that the supplement provided several lengthy example calculations and stated that they would know after the first stage how successful this new system would be.

The team that won general classification won a grand prize of 4000 lire. The runner-up of the race received 2000 lire, third was rewarded with 1000 lire, fourth got 600 lire, and fifth place received 400 lire. Each stage winner received 600 lire and second place on the day got 300 lire.

== Participants ==
Of the 56 riders that signed up to participate in the 1912 Giro d'Italia, 54 of them began the race on 19 May. Since the race's general classification was to be based around team points there were no independent riders as in years past. The organizers allowed the participating teams to have up to four riders, with each team needing three riders to finish each stage to remain in the race. There were a total of fourteen teams that started the 1912 Giro d'Italia. A French team was planning on competing in the race, but opted not to and so all the teams that competed were based in Italy. This edition of the Giro d'Italia saw the first teams enter the race that were not sponsored by a bicycle related industry. Each team was required to wear identical colored jerseys.

The fourteen teams that took part in the race were:

- Atala-Dunlop
- Bergami
- Bianchi
- Favero-Dunlop
- Gerbi
- Globo
- Goericke
- Legnano
- L'Italiana
- Peugeot
- Ranella
- Senior
- Soriani
- Stucchi

Atala-Dunlop was the favorite going into the race as the team was composed of 1909 winner Luigi Ganna, two-time winner Carlo Galetti, Giovanni Micheletto, and Eberardo Pavesi. The team was collectively known as "The Four Musketeers." The Gerbi team contained last year's third-place finisher Giovanni Gerbi, last year's runner-up and stage winner Giovanni Rossignoli, and former stage winner Pierino Albini. Legnano, Bianchi and Peugeot were also seen as contenders for the overall victory. The race also featured future Giro d'Italia winner Carlo Oriani who competed for the Stucchi team.

== Race overview ==
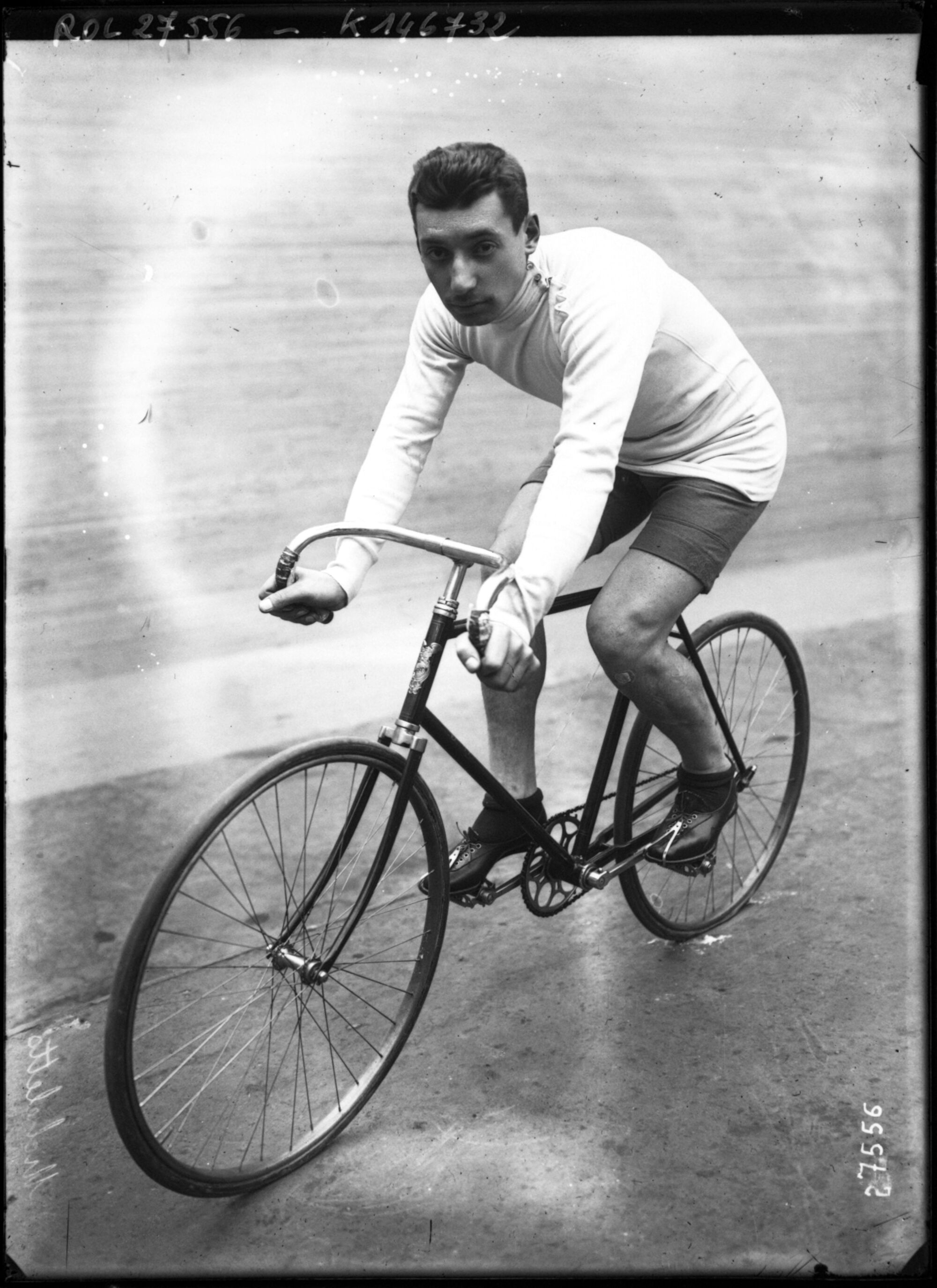
Italian Giovanni Micheletto, of Atala-Dunlop, won the opening stage of the race.

The race was planned to begin at 2:30 AM local time by the organizers, but due to large crowds and some participants arriving late, the race officially started at 2:43. The riders formed three groups on the road, of which the first one contained twenty riders when it passed through the checkpoint in Brescia. The group further thinned to sixteen by the time it reached Verona, and to eleven when it arrived at the checkpoint in Vicenza. From the group, the sprint to the finish line was mainly contested by Giovanni Micheletto and Giuseppe Santhià, of which the former managed to win the leg. With Atala-Dunlop's Micheletto winning the stage and his teammate Carlo Galetti finishing third, Atala-Dunlop acquired seven points and the lead in the race.

The second stage of the race saw a large group of around forty riders enter Mantua after over one hundred kilometers of racing. After the group broke into five or six smaller groups due to a large crash and in part due issues brought about by heavy fog. A group of seven was first to reach the stage's finish in Bologna, where Bianchi's Vincenzo Borgarello won the sprint to the line. Stage 3 began under heavy cloud coverage. The leading group on the road was reduced as the stage traversed the hillier portions of the stage. Ernesto Azzini of the Legnano team won the stage after edging out Eberardo Pavesi.

The race's fourth stage saw very rainy conditions throughout, which caused the roads to turn muddy and streams nearby the roads to overflow. The thirty riders that began the stage took the wrong turn onto Sabina rode for over 50 km (31 mi), once they had reached Civita Castellana, before realizing their errors. This, when combined with the weather and road conditions, caused the riders to protest to the race jury and get the stage cancelled. The riders then road a train to Rome for the start of the next stage. At the finish in Rome there were over 20,000 paying spectators waiting to see the finish of the stage. When news broke of the stage's cancelling, the spectators grew angry and the organizers refunded their tickets they had purchased to view the race. The route of the added ninth stage came from the route of the Giro di Lombardia, despite the initial protest of the Italian Velocopie Union. The prize money for the stage was split among the fourteen riders that noticed the mistake.

Atala-Dunlop's Luigi Ganna abandoned the race during the fifth stage due to injuries suffered from a crash during the fourth stage before it was cancelled. Galetti won the fifth leg, but with the placings on the stage, Peugeot took the race lead from Atala-Dunlop. Rain marred the start of the sixth stage at 6:40 local time, as well as most of the stage itself. A group of sixteen riders formed at the front of the race and was later reduced to ten before passing through Lucca. Lauro Bordin of the Gerbi team attacked and went on to ride solo, reaching the checkpoint in Spezia fifteen minutes quicker than Azzini, Cocchi, and Agostoni. Bordin reached the finish first, eighteen minutes ahead of the second-place finisher.

Borgarello won his second stage with his victory in the seventh stage, out-sprinting Micheletto and Carlo Durando. In the final sprint, Micheletto felt that Durando encroached him and moved ahead; this action caused the Italian fans to rush on to the track in anger. The police then moved the two riders to a bar, until the crowd dispersed. Micheletto won his second stage of the race two days later. Before the start of the final stage, Micheletto became sick and Pavesi convinced him to continue the race and finish the final stage. Borgarello won his third stage of the race, while Atala-Dunlop consolidated their lead and the race win by having two riders, Micheletto and Galetti, finish in the top four.

== Final standings ==
=== Stage results ===
Stage results
Stage	Date	Course	Distance	Type (Note: In 1912, there was no distinction in the rules between plain stages and mountain stages; the icons shown here indicate that the second, fifth, sixth, seventh, eighth, and ninth stages included major mountains.)	Winner (Note: The name of the stage winner's team is listed in parentheses.)	Race Leader
1	19 May	Milan to Padua	398.8 km (248 mi)	Plain stage	Giovanni Micheletto (ITA) (Atala-Dunlop)	Atala-Dunlop
2	21 May	Padua to Bologna	328.8 km (204 mi)	Stage with mountain(s)	Vincenzo Borgarello (ITA) (Legnano)	Atala-Dunlop
3	23 May	Bologna to Pescara	362.5 km (225 mi)	Plain stage	Ernesto Azzini (ITA) (Legnano)	Atala-Dunlop
4	25 May	Pescara to Rome	~~294 km (183 mi)~~	Plain stage	Stage Cancelled	Atala-Dunlop
5	27 May	Rome to Florence	337 km (209 mi)	Stage with mountain(s)	Carlo Galetti (ITA) (Atala-Dunlop)	Peugeot
6	29 May	Florence to Genoa	267.5 km (166 mi)	Stage with mountain(s)	Lauro Bordin (ITA) (Gerbi)	Atala-Dunlop
7	31 May	Genoa to Turin	230 km (143 mi)	Stage with mountain(s)	Vincenzo Borgarello (ITA) (Legnano)	Atala-Dunlop
8	2 June	Turin to Milan	280 km (174 mi)	Stage with mountain(s)	Giovanni Micheletto (ITA) (Atala-Dunlop)	Atala-Dunlop
9	4 June	Milan to Bergamo	235 km (146 mi)	Stage with mountain(s)	Vincenzo Borgarello (ITA) (Legnano)	Atala-Dunlop
	Total		2,439.6 km (1,516 mi) (Note: This total excludes the fourth stage's planned length because the stage was cancelled.)			

=== General classification ===
There were five teams who had completed all nine stages with the required number of riders. For these teams, the points they received from each of their stage placing's were added up for the general classification. The team with the most accumulated points was the winner.

Final general classification (1–6)
Rank	Team	Points
1	Atala-Dunlop	33
2	Peugeot	23
3	Gerbi	8
4	Goericke	8
5	Globo	7
6	Legnano	3

=== Incoraggiamento classification ===
Final incoraggiamento classification (1–3)
Rank	Team	Points
1	Goerike	32
2	Stucchi	22
3	Globo	7

== Aftermath ==
The race organizers, La Gazzetta dello Sport recognized the team point system was not a success and reverted to the individual point based system for the general classification for the 1913 edition. Despite the failure of the team system, the newspaper still achieved success with the race, causing them to shift to a daily newspaper rather than three times a week. If the race had been contested based upon the time it took to complete each stage and their respective sum for each rider, the race would have been won by Carlo Galetti.
