= 1914 Giro di Lombardia =

Race details
- Dates: 25 October 1914
- Stages: 1
- Distance: 235 km (146.0 mi)

Results
	Winner	Lauro Bordin (ITA)
	Second	Giuseppe Azzini (ITA)
	Third	Pierino Piacco (ITA)

The 1914 Giro di Lombardia was the tenth edition of the Giro di Lombardia cycle race and was held on 25 October 1914, over a course of 235 km (146 mi). The race was won by the Italian Lauro Bordin, who reached the finish line at an average speed of 32.290 km/h (20.064 mph), preceding his fellow countrymen Giuseppe Azzini and Pierino Piacco.

44 cyclists departed from Milan and 29 finished the race.

== General classification ==
Final general classification

Rank	Rider	Team	Time
1	Lauro Bordin (ITA)	Bianchi-Pirelli	7h 16' 40"
2	Giuseppe Azzini (ITA)	Bianchi-Pirelli	+ 0"
3	Pierino Piacco (ITA)		+ 0"
4	Camillo Bertarelli (ITA)		+ 0"
5	Eberardo Pavesi (ITA)	Bianchi-Pirelli	+ 0"
6	Costante Girardengo (ITA)		+ 0"
7	Umberto Ripamonti (ITA)		+ 0"
8	Emilio Petiva (ITA)		+ 4' 40"
9	Ugo Agostoni (ITA)	Bianchi-Pirelli	+ 6' 10"
10	Angelo Gremo (ITA)		+ 8' 30"
