= 1909 Giro d'Italia, Stage 5 to Stage 8 =

Cycling race stages

The 1909 Giro d'Italia was the inaugural edition of the Giro d'Italia, one of cycling's Grand Tours. The Giro began in Milan on 13 May, and Stage 5 occurred on 23 May with a stage from Rome. The race finished in Milan on 30 May.

== Stage 5 ==
23 May 1909 — Rome to Florence, 346.4 km (215.2 mi)

Stage 5 result

Rank	Rider	Time
1	Luigi Ganna (ITA)	12h 48' 53"
2	Carlo Galetti (ITA)	s.t.
3	Ezio Corlaita (ITA)	s.t.
4	Ernesto Azzini (ITA)	
5	Enrico Sala (ITA)	
6	Giovanni Rossignoli (ITA)	
7	Luigi Chiodi (ITA)	
8	Clemente Canepari (ITA)	
9	Luigi Azzini (ITA)	
10	Piero Lampaggi (ITA)	

General classification after Stage 5

Rank	Rider	Points
1	Luigi Ganna (ITA)	18
2	Carlo Galetti (ITA)	20
3	Giovanni Rossignoli (ITA)	30
4	Ernesto Azzini (ITA)	40
5	Clemente Canepari (ITA)	42
6	Louis Trousselier (FRA)	50
7	Carlo Oriani (ITA)	51
8	Enrico Sala (ITA)	66
9	Dario Beni (ITA)	70
10	Ottorino Celli (ITA)	77

== Stage 6 ==
25 May 1909 — Florence to Genoa, 294.4 km (182.9 mi)

Stage 6 result

Rank	Rider	Time
1	Giovanni Rossignoli (ITA)	10h 56' 58"
2	Carlo Galetti (ITA)	s.t.
3	Luigi Ganna (ITA)	+ 13' 57"
4	Ernesto Azzini (ITA)	
5	Clemente Canepari (ITA)	
6	Luigi Chiodi (ITA)	
7	Ottorino Celli (ITA)	
8	Dario Beni (ITA)	
9	Piero Lampaggi (ITA)	
10	Carlo Oriani (ITA)	

General classification after Stage 6

Rank	Rider	Points
1	Luigi Ganna (ITA)	21
2	Carlo Galetti (ITA)	22
3	Giovanni Rossignoli (ITA)	31
4	Ernesto Azzini (ITA)	44
5	Clemente Canepari (ITA)	47
6	Carlo Oriani (ITA)	61
=7	Dario Beni (ITA)	78
=7	Enrico Sala (ITA)	78
9	Ottorino Celli (ITA)	84
10	Piero Lampaggi (ITA)	106

== Stage 7 ==
27 May 1909 — Genoa to Turin, 357.9 km (222.4 mi)

Stage 7 result

Rank	Rider	Time
1	Luigi Ganna (ITA)	13h 41' 11"
2	Giovanni Rossignoli (ITA)	+ 4' 00"
3	Carlo Galetti (ITA)	+ 25' 00"
4	Clemente Canepari (ITA)	
5	Luigi Chiodi (ITA)	
6	Carlo Oriani (ITA)	
7	Giovanni Cocchi (ITA)	
8	Alberto Petrino (ITA)	
9	Enrico Sala (ITA)	
10	Ernesto Azzini (ITA)	

General classification after Stage 7

Rank	Rider	Points
1	Luigi Ganna (ITA)	22
2	Carlo Galetti (ITA)	25
3	Giovanni Rossignoli (ITA)	33
4	Clemente Canepari (ITA)	51
5	Ernesto Azzini (ITA)	54
6	Carlo Oriani (ITA)	67
7	Enrico Sala (ITA)	87
8	Dario Beni (ITA)	90
9	Ottorino Celli (ITA)	97
10	Alberto Petrino (ITA)	116

== Stage 8 ==
30 May 1909 — Turin to Milan, 206.1 km (128.1 mi)

Stage 8 result

Rank	Rider	Time
1	Dario Beni (ITA)	6h 55' 19"
2	Carlo Galetti (ITA)	s.t.
3	Luigi Ganna (ITA)	s.t.
4	Carlo Oriani (ITA)	
5	Luigi Azzini (ITA)	
6	Luigi Chiodi (ITA)	
7	Giovanni Rossignoli (ITA)	
8	Ezio Corlaita (ITA)	
9	Clemente Canepari (ITA)	
10	Attilio Zavatti (ITA)	

General classification after Stage 8

Rank	Rider	Points
1	Luigi Ganna (ITA)	25
2	Carlo Galetti (ITA)	27
3	Giovanni Rossignoli (ITA)	40
4	Clemente Canepari (ITA)	59
5	Carlo Oriani (ITA)	72
6	Ernesto Azzini (ITA)	77
7	Dario Beni (ITA)	91
8	Enrico Sala (ITA)	98
9	Ottorino Celli (ITA)	117
10	Giovanni Marchese (ITA)	139
