= Mario Santagostini =

Italian poet

Mario Santagostini (born 1951) is an Italian poet.

== Biography ==
Mario Santagostini was born in Milan in 1951. He published several collections of poetry starting when he was twenty years old. In 2014 he won the Premio Internazionale città di Como with the collection Felicità senza soggetto. In 2023 he won the Cetonaverde Poetry Prize.

== Poetry ==
- Uscire di città, Milano, S. Ghisoni, 1972; nuova ed. Azzate, Stampa 2009, 2012.
- Come rosata linea, Milano, Società di poesia, 1981.
- L'olimpiade del '40, Milano, Mondadori, 1994.
- Nuove poesie, Varese, NEM, 1999.
- L'idea del bene, Parma, Guanda, 2001.
- La vita, Faloppio, Lietocolle, 2004.
- Versi del malanimo, Milano, Mondadori, 2007.
- A., Faloppio, LietoColle, 2010.
- Il vento, ma inteso come forma di vita, Milano, Quaderni di Orfeo, 2011.
- Felicità senza soggetto, Milano, Mondadori, 2014.
- Kafka in Palestina, nel 1931, Azzate, Stampa, 2016.
- Il libro della lettera arrivata, e mai partita, Milano, Garzanti, 2022.
