= Alfonso Calzolari =

Italian cyclist

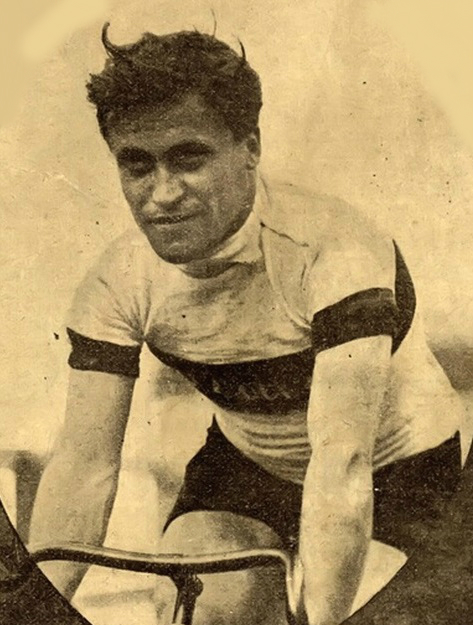

Personal information
- Full name: Alfonso Calzolari
- Born: 30 April 1887 Vergato, Italy
- Died: 7 February 1983 (aged 95)

Cycling career
- Sport: Cycling
- Discipline: Road
- Role: Rider

Professional teams
- 1909–1911: Individual
- 1912: L'Italiana
- 1913: Atala/Stucchi
- 1914–1915: Stucchi
- 1916–1917: Individual
- 1918: Stucchi/Peugeot
- 1919–1920: Stucchi
- 1921–1926: Individual

Major wins
- Grand Tours Giro d'Italia General classification (1914)

Alfonso Calzolari (30 April 1887 – 7 February 1983) was an Italian professional road racing cyclist. Calzolari was born in Vergato. The highlight of his career was his overall win in the 1914 Giro d'Italia.

== Major results ==
1909
1st Coppa Cesaroni-Venanzi

1910
3rd Coppa Appennino

1912
2nd Giro di Romagna

1913
1st Giro dell'Emilia
3rd Giro della Provincia Romana
5th Milan–San Remo

1914
1st Overall Giro d'Italia

1st Stage 2

10th Milan–San Remo

1915
10th Milan–San Remo

1918
3rd Giro dell'Emilia
