= Lauro Bordin =

Italian cyclist

Personal information
- Born: 7 July 1890 Crespino, Italy
- Died: 19 May 1963 (aged 72) Milan, Italy

Cycling career
- Sport: Cycling
- Role: Rider

Major wins
- Grand Tours Giro d'Italia 3 individual stages (1911, 1912, 1913) One-day races and Classics Giro di Lombardia (1914)

Lauro Bordin (7 July 1890 – 19 May 1963) was an Italian racing cyclist. He won the 1914 edition of the Giro di Lombardia.

Bordin won stages in the 1911 Giro d'Italia, 1912 Giro d'Italia and 1913 Giro d'Italia. He also rode the 1914 Giro d'Italia, and escaped in the third stage after 15 km, and rode alone for 350 km, which made it the longest (unsuccessful) breakaway in the history of the Giro.
