= Luigi Lucotti =

Italian cyclist

Personal information
- Full name: Luigi Lucotti
- Born: 18 December 1893 Voghera, Italy
- Died: 29 December 1980 (aged 87) Voghera, Italy

Cycling career
- Sport: Cycling
- Discipline: Road
- Role: Rider

Major wins
- Three stages Tour de France; One stage Giro d'Italia

Luigi Lucotti (18 December 1893 in Voghera – 29 December 1980 in Voghera) was an Italian road bicycle racer who has won three stages in the Tour de France and a stage at the Giro d'Italia.

== Major results ==
1914
3rd overall – Giro d’Italia

1st, Stage 6

1919
7th overall – Tour de France

1st, Stage 12, Genève > Strasbourg
1st, Stage 13, Strasbourg > Metz

1921 – Ancora
4th overall – Tour de France, @ +2 hours 39 minutes 18 seconds

1st, Stage 8, Perpignan > Toulon
