= Emilio Petiva =

Italian cyclist

Personal information
- Born: January 30, 1890 Turin, Italy
- Died: September 17, 1980 (aged 90) Turin, Italy

Cycling career
- Sport: Cycling
- Discipline: Road
- Role: Rider

Professional teams
- 1910: Peugeot
- 1911: Fiat
- 1912: Maino
- 1913: Peugeot-Wolber
- 1913: Ganna
- 1913-1914: Stucchi
- 1920: Gaia
- 1922-1923: Maino

Emilio Petiva (January 30, 1890 in Turin — 17 September 1980 in Turin) was an Italian cyclist.

== Palmares ==
1910
National Road Champion
3rd Milano-Modena
1913
2nd Milano-Modena
2nd Coppa Casalegno
1914
8th Giro di Lombardia
1919
2nd Tour des Alpes
1920
Tour des Alpes
2nd Turin-Genoa
3rd Giro dell'Emilia
4th Giro d’Italia
1921
3rd Genoa-Nice
8th Giro di Lombardia
1922
2nd Milano–Torino
3rd Rome-Naples-Rome
1923
3rd Giro del Veneto
8th Giro d'Italia
1924
Coppa Placci
2nd Milano-Modena
2nd Coppa Cavacciocchi
1925
Coppa Placci
1926
Giro dell'Umbria
