= Umberto Ripamonti =

Italian cyclist

Personal information
- Born: 22 April 1895 Milan, Italy
- Died: 4 February 1959 Milan, Italy

Cycling career
- Sport: Cycling
- Discipline: Road
- Role: Rider

Umberto Ripamonti (22 April 1895 — 4 February 1959) was an Italian racing cyclist. He rode in the 1924 Tour de France.
