= Carlo Oriani =

Italian cyclist (1888–1917)

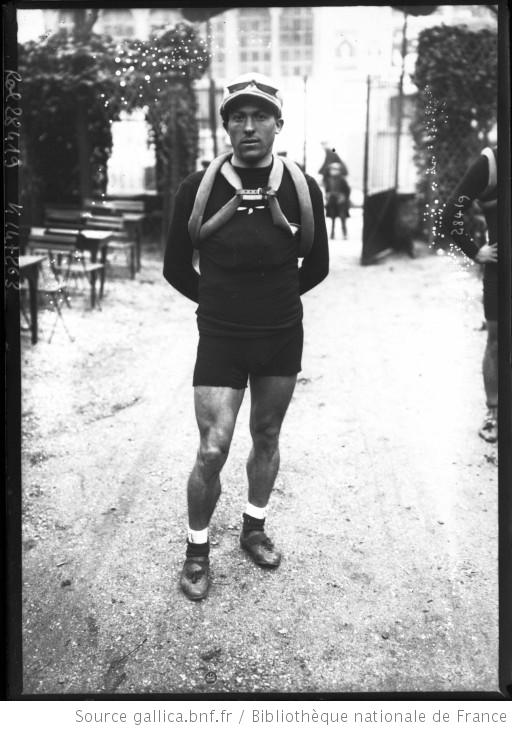

Personal information
- Full name: Carlo Oriani
- Born: 5 November 1888 Cinisello Balsamo, Italy
- Died: 3 December 1917 (aged 29) Caserta, Italy

Cycling career
- Sport: Cycling
- Role: Rider

Professional teams
- 1908: Individual
- 1909: Stucchi
- 1910: Individual
- 1911: Bianchi
- 1913: Stucchi
- 1913: Maino
- 1914–1915: Bianchi

Major wins
- Grand Tours Giro d'Italia General classification (1913) One-day races and Classics Giro di Lombardia (1912)

Carlo Oriani (5 November 1888 – 3 December 1917) was an Italian professional road racing cyclist. The highlight of his career was his overall win in the 1913 Giro d'Italia.

He died in the aftermath of the Battle of Caporetto from pneumonia contracted as a result of diving into the icy waters of the Tagliamento river to save a fellow retreating soldier.
