= Giovanni Roncon =

Italian cyclist

Personal information
- Born: 2 January 1893
- Died: 10 June 1963 (aged 70)

Cycling career
- Sport: Cycling
- Discipline: Road
- Role: Rider

Major wins
- Stage races Giro del Veneto (1912) One-day races and Classics Giro della Romagna (1921)

Giovanni Roncon (2 January 1893 – 10 June 1963) was an Italian racing cyclist. He rode in the 1930 Tour de France.
