= Giuseppe Santhià =

Italian cyclist

Personal information
- Born: 19 January 1886 Cavaglià, Italy
- Died: 18 February 1978 (aged 92)

Cycling career
- Sport: Cycling
- Role: Rider

Major wins
- Grand Tours Giro d'Italia 3 individual stages (1911, 1913) One-day races and Classics Giro del Piemonte (1914)

Giuseppe Santhià (19 January 1886 – 18 February 1978) was an Italian racing cyclist. He won stage 6 of the 1911 Giro d'Italia.
