= Pierino Albini =

Italian cyclist

Personal information
- Born: 16 December 1885 Arconate, Italy
- Died: 12 March 1955 (aged 69) Arconate, Italy

Cycling career
- Sport: Cycling
- Role: Rider

Pierino Albini (16 December 1885 – 12 March 1955) was an Italian racing cyclist. He won stage 4 of the 1910 Giro d'Italia.
