= Giro d'Italia =

Cycling road race held in Italy

- 2026 Giro d'Italia

Race details
- Date: May–June
- Region: Italy and nearby countries
- English name: Tour of Italy
- Local name: Giro d'Italia (in Italian)
- Nickname: La Corsa Rosa (The Pink Race)
- Discipline: Road
- Competition: UCI World Tour
- Type: Grand Tour
- Organiser: RCS Sport
- Race director: Mauro Vegni
- Web site: giroditalia.it

History
- First edition: 13 May 1909; 117 years ago
- Editions: 109 (as of 2026)
- First winner: Luigi Ganna (ITA)
- Most wins: Alfredo Binda (ITA); Fausto Coppi (ITA); Eddy Merckx (BEL); (5 wins each)
- Most recent: Jonas Vingegaard (DEN)

The Giro d'Italia (pronounced [ˈdʒiːro diˈtaːlja]; lit. 'Tour of Italy'), also known simply as the Giro, is an annual multiple-stage road cycling race primarily held in Italy. The first race was organized in 1909 to increase sales of the newspaper La Gazzetta dello Sport, and the race is still run by a subsidiary of that paper's owner. The race has been held annually since its first edition in 1909, except during the two world wars. As the Giro gained prominence and popularity, the race was lengthened, and the peloton expanded from primarily Italian participation to riders from all over the world. The Giro is a UCI World Tour event, which means that the teams that compete in the race are mostly UCI WorldTeams, with some additional teams invited as 'wild cards'.

The Giro is one of professional cycling's three-week-long Grand Tours, and after the Tour de France is the second most important stage race in the world (the Triple Crown of Cycling denotes the achievement of winning the Giro, the Tour and the UCI Road World Championships in the same season). The Giro is usually held during May, sometimes continuing into early June. While the route changes each year, the format of the race stays the same, with at least two time trials, and a passage through the mountains of the Alps, including the Dolomites. Like the other Grand Tours, the modern editions of the Giro d'Italia normally consist of 21 stages over a 23- or 24-day period that includes two or three rest days.

The rider with the lowest aggregate time is the leader of the general classification and wears the pink jersey. While the general classification gathers the most attention, stage wins are prestigious of themselves, and there are other contests held within the Giro: the points classification, the mountains classification for the climbers, young rider classification for the riders under the age of 25, and the team classification.

== History ==
=== Origins and first race (1909) ===
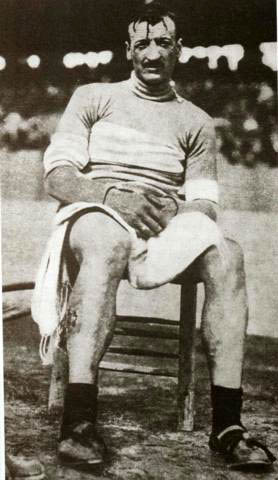
Luigi Ganna, the winner of the inaugural Giro d'Italia

The idea of holding a bicycle race that navigated around Italy was inspired by the Tour de France and the success that L'Auto had gained from it. It was first suggested when La Gazzetta dello Sport editor Tullo Morgagni sent a telegram to the paper's owner, Emilio Costamagna, and cycling editor, Armando Cougnet, stating the need for an Italian tour. At the time La Gazzetta's rival, Corriere della Sera was planning on holding a bicycle race of its own, after the success they had gained from holding an automobile race. Morgagni then decided to try to hold their race before Corriere della Sera could hold theirs, but La Gazzetta lacked the money. However, after the success La Gazzetta had with creating the Giro di Lombardia and Milan–San Remo, the owner Costamagna decided to go through with the idea. Their bike race was announced on 7 August 1908 in the first page of that day's edition of La Gazzetta dello Sport. The race was to be held in May 1909.

Since the organizers lacked the 25,000 lire needed to hold the race, they consulted Primo Bongrani, an accountant at the bank Cassa di Risparmio and friend of the three organizers. Bongrani proceeded to go around Italy asking for donations to help hold the race. Bongrani's efforts were largely successful, he had procured enough money to cover the operating costs. Prize money was supplied by a casino in San Remo who Francesco Sghirla, a former Gazzetta employee, encouraged to contribute to the race. Even Corriere, La Gazzetta's rival, gave 3,000 lire to the race's fund.

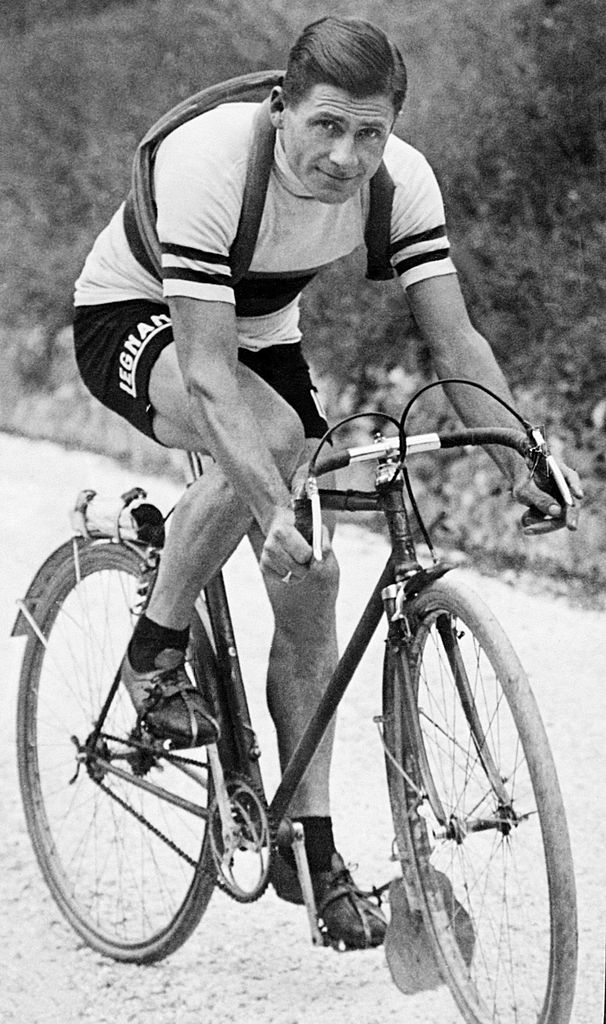
Alfredo Binda, winner of five editions of the Giro in the 1920s and 1930s

On 13 May 1909 at 02:53, 127 riders started the first Giro d'Italia at Piazzale Loreto in Milan. The race was split into eight stages covering 2,448 km (1,521 mi). A total of 49 riders finished, with Italian Luigi Ganna winning. Ganna won three individual stages and the General Classification. Ganna received 5,325 lire as a winner's prize, with the last rider in the general classification receiving 300 lire. The Giro's director received only 150 lire a month, 150 lire fewer than the last-placed rider. The first Giro was won by Luigi Ganna, who had the fewest total points at the end of the race.

=== 1910–1952 ===
The same format was used for the next two years and resulted in Carlo Galetti winning.

In 1912, there was no individual classification, instead there was only a team classification, which was won by Team Atala. The 1912 Giro is the only time the competition has not had an individual classification. For the 1914 Giro d'Italia, in which stages were up to 430 km (267 mi) long, the scoring format was changed from a points-based system to a simple time-based system, in which the cyclist who had the lowest aggregate time at the end of the race would win.

The Giro was suspended for four years from 1915 to 1918, due to the First World War. Costante Girardengo was the winner of the first Giro after the war in 1919.

The dominant figure in the 1920s was Alfredo Binda, who won his first Giro in 1925 and followed this up with another victory in 1927, in which he won 12 of the 15 stages. Victory in 1929 came courtesy of eight successive stage wins. At the height of his dominance Binda was called to the head office of La Gazzetta dello Sport in 1930; the newspaper accused him of ruining the race and offered him 22,000 lire to be less dominant, which he refused. Binda won five Giros before he was usurped as the dominant cyclist by Gino Bartali.

Nicknamed the "Iron Man of Tuscany" for his endurance, Bartali won two Giros during the 1930s, in 1936 and 1937. Bartali's dominance was challenged in 1940, the last Giro before the Second World War, when he was defeated by his 20-year-old teammate Fausto Coppi.

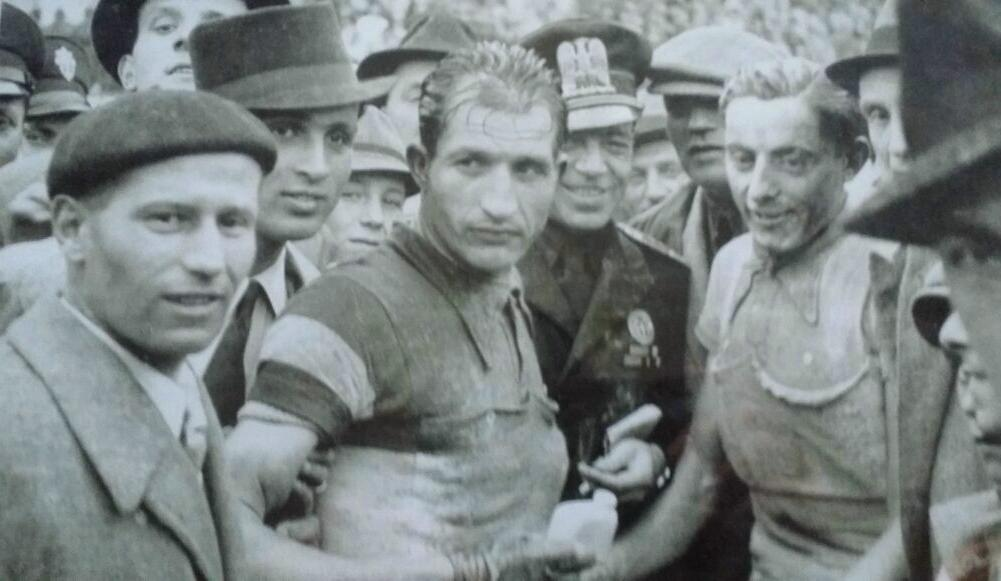
Fausto Coppi and Gino Bartali

Bartali and Coppi's rivalry divided Italy. Bartali, a conservative, was venerated in the rural, agrarian south, while Coppi, more worldly, secular, innovative in diet and training, was a hero of the industrial north. They became teammates in 1940 when Eberrardo Pavesi, head of the Legnano team, took on Coppi to ride for Bartali. Bartali thought Coppi was "as thin as a mutton bone", but accepted. Their rivalry started when Coppi, the helper, won the Giro aged 20 and Bartali, the star, marshalled the two men's team to chase him.

The rivalry between Bartali and Coppi intensified after the war. Bartali won his last Giro in 1946, narrowly beating Coppi, now riding for the Bianchi team. Coppi then won his second Giro the following year. Coppi abandoned the 1948 Giro d'Italia in protest against the small penalty given to Fiorenzo Magni. Coppi won a further three Giros and twice, in 1949 and 1952, Coppi won the Giro d'Italia and the Tour de France in the same year, the first rider to do so.

=== 1953–1967 ===
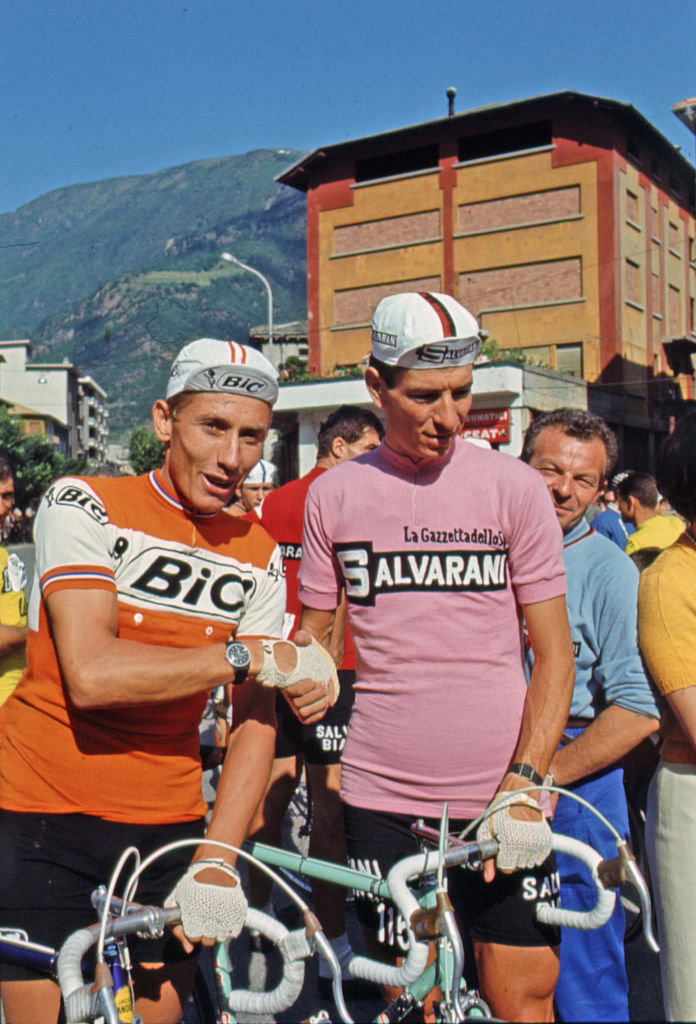
Jacques Anquetil (left) and Felice Gimondi (right, wearing the Maglia Rosa) at the 1967 Giro d'Italia

Swiss Hugo Koblet became the first non-Italian to win the race in 1950. No one dominated the tour during the 1950s, Coppi, Charly Gaul and Fiorenzo Magni each won two Giros during the decade.

The 1960s were similar. At the 1960 Giro d'Italia, Jacques Anquetil took advantage of a breakaway he was part of on stage 3 to take the overall lead. Anquetil then led the lead move to Jos Hoevenaers, who had been part of a breakaway on stage 6. In the long time trial of the race on stage 14, Anquetil retook the lead, finishing 1:27 minutes ahead of Baldini and more than 6 minutes on Gaul. His speed had been so fast that had the organizers applied the usual rules, 70 riders would have missed the time cut. In the event, the rules were loosened and only two riders eliminated. Ahead of the final mountain stages, Anquetil now led Nencini by 3:40 minutes, with Gaul in fifth, 7:32 minutes behind. Stage 20 included the Gavia Pass for the first time in the race's history. On the ascent, Nencini was able to establish a gap to Anquetil, after the latter had a flat tire. More punctures and three bike changes followed on the dangerous descent, putting Anquetil's race lead in danger. He teamed up with Agostino Coletto, whom he offered money to help him in the chase effort, to limit his losses. At the finish in Bormio, Gaul won ahead of Nencini, with Anquetil losing only 2:34 minutes and retaining the pink jersey by 28 seconds. Following a ceremonial final stage, Anquetil arrived in Milan the winner of the Giro for the first time. Anquetil went on to become the first rider to win all three Grand Tours and won the Giro again in 1964, while Franco Balmamion won two successive Giros in 1962 and 1963.

Felice Gimondi won the 1967 Giro d'Italia and went on to become the second rider, after Anquetil, to win all three Grand Tours.

=== 1968–1996 ===
Belgian Eddy Merckx was the dominant figure during the 1970s. His first victory came in 1968, a race which saw two important firsts: the first tests for drug use and the first prologue. A total of eight riders tested positive during the Giro. Merckx won the race for the first time after winning the twelfth stage's finish atop the Tre Cime di Lavaredo to gain the race lead. En route to the overall victory, he won four stages. He returned in 1969 and was leading the race after the sixteenth stage that ended in Savona. He tested positive for a banned substance after the stage and was disqualified from the race; he always denied any wrongdoing. The UCI lifted his suspension almost immediately but he was not allowed to start stage 17. Felice Gimondi took the lead after Merckx's dismissal and held it until the race's conclusion.

Merckx came back the following year at the request of his sponsor. He took the lead after stage five and never relinquished it; he dominated the lengthy stage nine time trial. He went on to win the Tour de France, and in doing so became the third rider to win two Grand Tours in a single calendar year. He did not compete in the 1971 event, riding the Critérium du Dauphiné Libéré instead. Felice Gimondi lost substantial time early on in the race to put him out of contention, while fellow Italian and teammate Gianni Motta tested positive for banned substances and was disqualified. Swedish cyclist Gösta Pettersson gained the lead after the race's eighteenth stage and held it to the finish. Pettersson became the first Swedish cyclist to win a Grand Tour.

Merckx returned to the Giro in 1972 and resumed his domination. He took the lead after a long solo attack during the race's seventh stage and held it until the finish. He led the 1973 Giro d'Italia from start to finish, a feat that had not been achieved since Alfredo Binda did so in 1927.

In 1976, Juan Manuel Santisteban died after an accident early in the race. By the third week it seemed as though Belgian rider Johan De Muynck was going to claim victory, but Gimondi rode a strong final individual time trial to win his third Giro by a very small margin. He had not been considered a contender before the race. Belgians Michel Pollentier and Johan De Muynck won the two subsequent Giros in 1977 and 1978.

In 1980, Frenchman Bernard Hinault became France's first winner since Anquetil in 1964. He would win another two Giros in 1982 and 1985.

The 1987 edition saw controversy between Carrera Jeans–Vagabond's two general classification riders Roberto Visentini and Stephen Roche. Roche led the race early on but lost the lead to Visentini after crashing during the thirteenth stage. Roche attacked on the race's mountainous fifteenth stage despite orders from Carrera team management not to. Roche took the lead and wound up winning the race. He also won the Tour de France and the men's road race at the World Championships to complete the Triple Crown of Cycling.

The fourteenth stage of the 1988 Giro d'Italia saw very poor weather, particularly on the slopes of the Passo di Gavia. Franco Chioccioli led the race at the start of the fabled fourteenth stage. On the slopes of the Gavia, Andrew Hampsten and Erik Breukink rode away from their fellow riders; Breukink won the stage, but Hampsten took the overall lead. Hampsten went on to win the race and became the first non-European to win the race.

Spaniard Miguel Indurain, winner of five Tours, won successive Giros in 1991 and 1992.

=== 1997–2016 ===
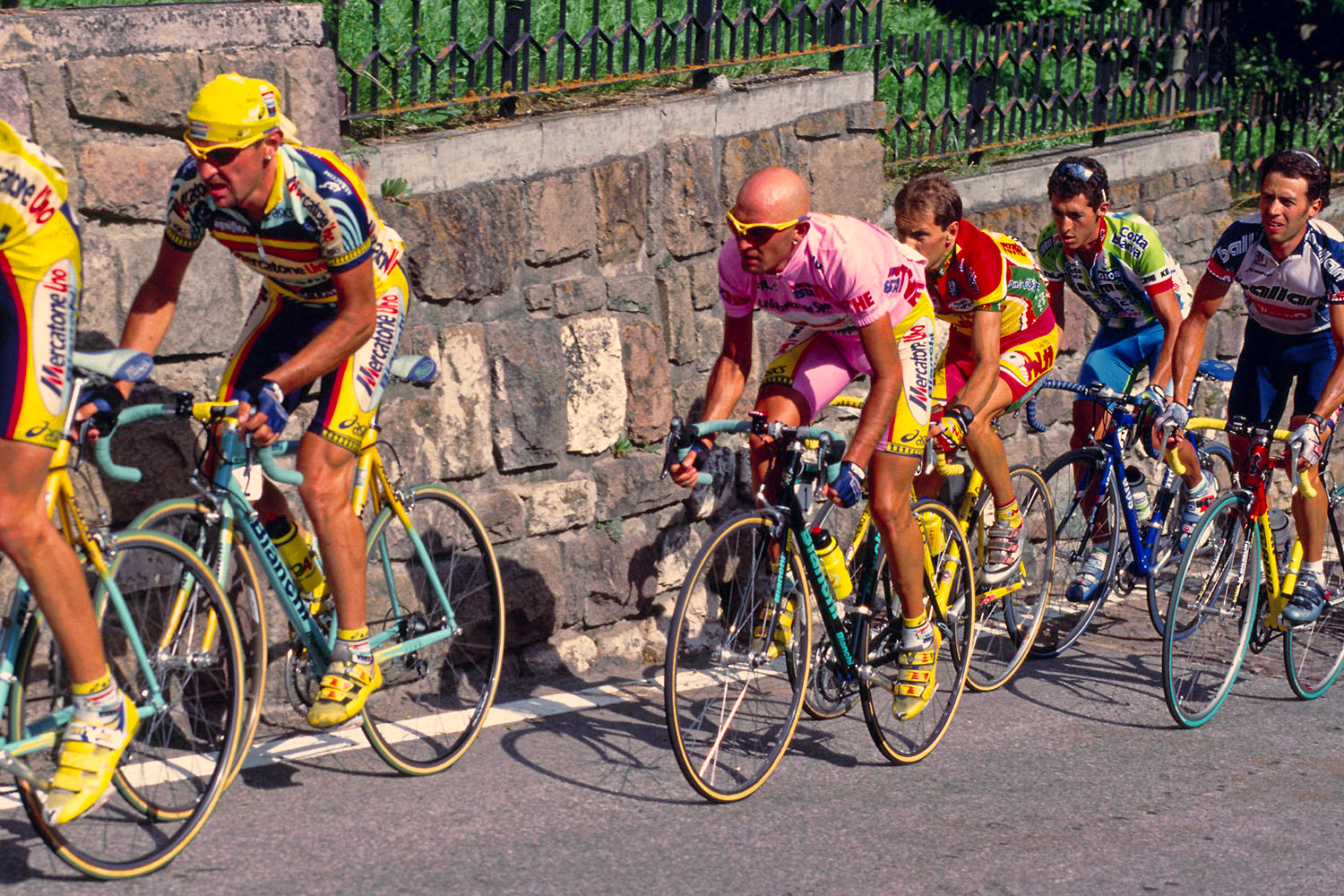
Marco Pantani wearing the Maglia Rosa

Ivan Gotti's wins in 1997 and 1999 were either side of the first win by Marco Pantani's win in 1998. Pantani was considered a favorite to win the Giro d'Italia Other contenders included Gotti, Alex Zülle and 1996 winner Pavel Tonkov. Pantani lost time in the initial prologue in Nice and further time to his main rivals during the fifteenth stage, an individual time trial in Trieste. By that point, Pantani faced a disadvantage of almost four minutes to Zülle before the Dolomites mountain stages and an individual time trial on the penultimate stage, a discipline that favored Zülle and Tonkov. In the seventeenth stage to Selva di Val Gardena, Pantani took the maglia rosa, the leader's jersey, for the first time in his career after attacking Zülle on the Marmolada climb. Although Pantani crossed the finish line behind Giuseppe Guerini, he finished over four minutes ahead of Zülle, maintaining an advantage of thirty seconds on the general classification over Tonkov, thirty-one seconds on Guerini and over a minute on Zülle. In the following stage to Alpe di Pampeago, he finished second behind Tonkov but maintained the general classification lead over him and gained further time on Zülle and Guerini. In the eighteenth stage to Plan di Montecampione, Pantani repeatedly attacked Tonkov, dropping him in the last three kilometers and winning the stage to face the individual time trial on the penultimate stage with a lead of almost a minute and a half. Zülle lost contact with the favorites in the first climb and ended up losing over thirty minutes. Having won over two minutes on Pantani in the previous time trial, Tonkov was considered superior to Pantani on the time trial discipline, but the Italian finished third in the penultimate stage, gaining an additional five seconds on Tonkov. Pantani was thus able to maintain his lead to win the Giro d'Italia with a minute and a half over Tonkov and more than six minutes over Guerini. He also won the Mountains classification and finished second in the Points classification.

Pantani subsequently went on to win the 1998 Tour de France, thus completing the rare feat of winning the Giro d'Italia and the Tour de France in the same calendar year.

Pantani returned to the Giro in 1999 while in peak physical form. Pantani gained the lead after the race's fourteenth stage and as the race hit the high mountains, he extended his lead with three stage wins. On the morning of the twentieth stage, Pantani was dismissed from the Giro after having hematocrit levels above 50%. 1997 victor Ivan Gotti, who was second place at the time, subsequently took the lead and wound up winning the Giro for the second time in his career.

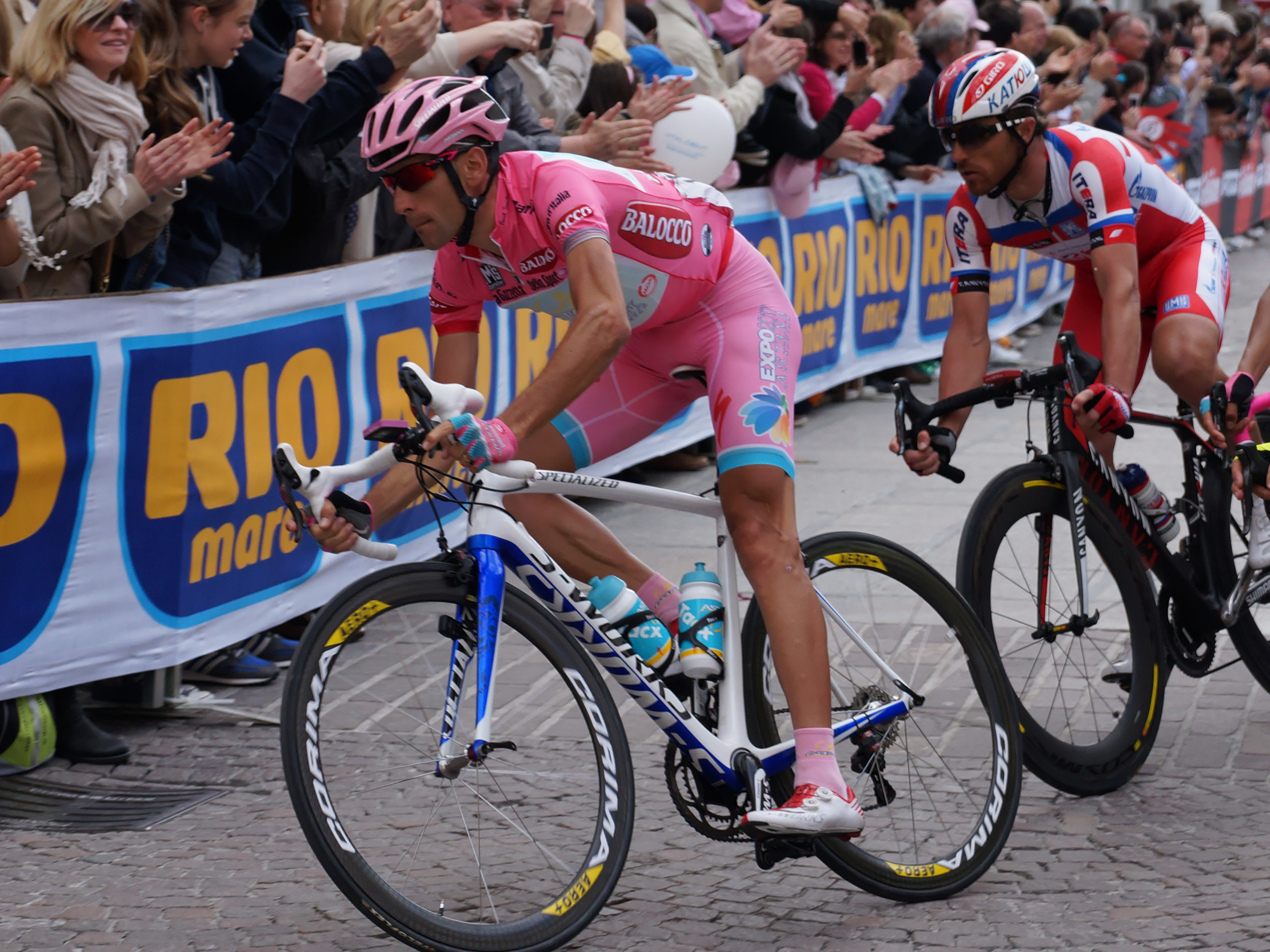
Vincenzo Nibali wearing the Maglia Rosa at the 2013 Giro d'Italia

Gilberto Simoni was the winner in 2001 and 2003, with Paolo Savoldelli victorious in 2002 and 2005. Other repeat winners this century have been Ivan Basso (2006 and 2010), Spaniard Alberto Contador in 2008 and 2015 and Vincenzo Nibali in 2013 and 2016. Contador also looked to have won the 2011 edition, a race during which Wouter Weylandt suffered a fatal crash on the third stage, but he was later stripped of the title after he was found guilty of doping in the 2010 Tour de France, and runner-up Michele Scarponi was awarded the victory.

The first South American winner was Nairo Quintana of Colombia in 2014.

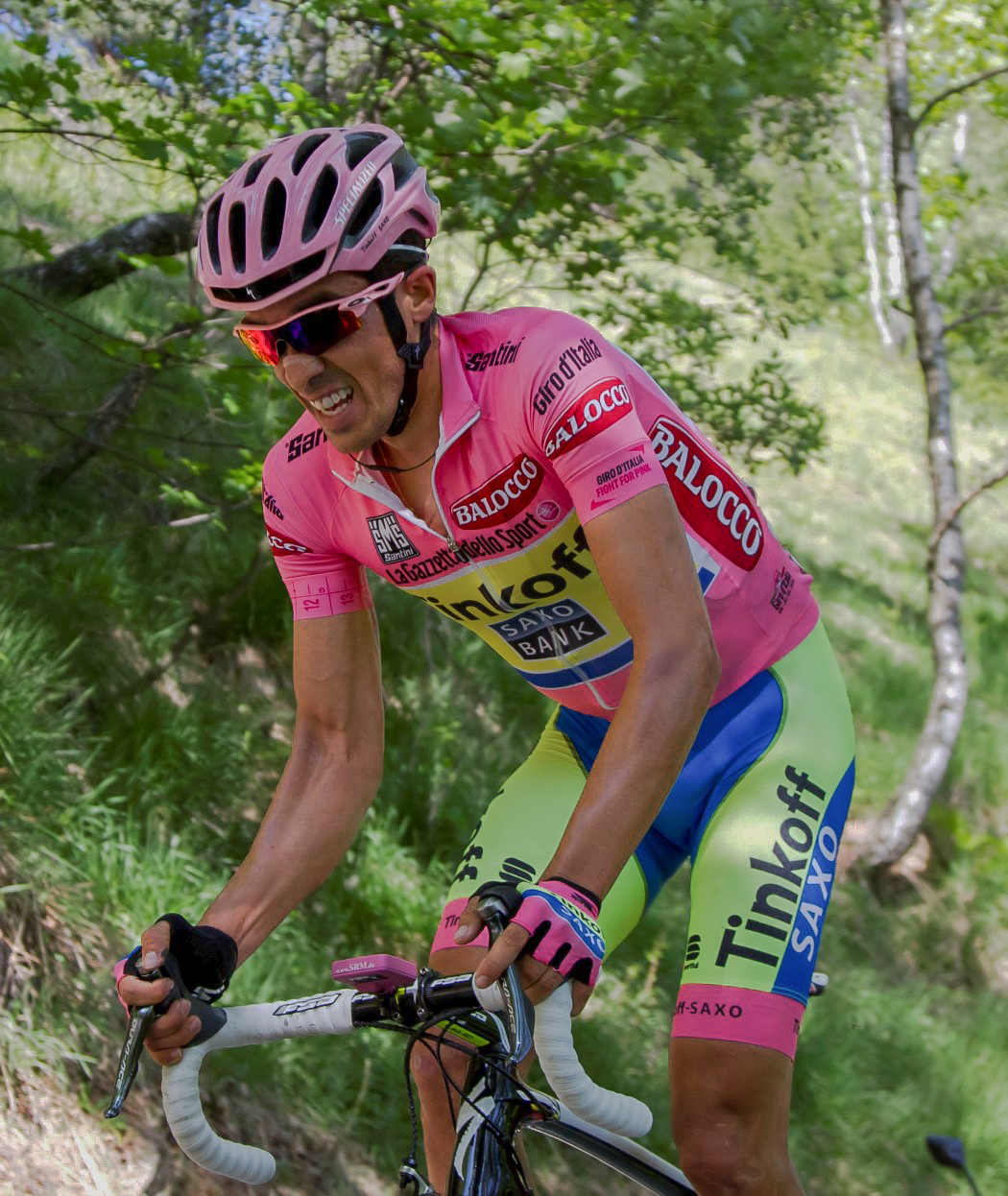
Alberto Contador wearing the Maglia Rosa at the 2015 Giro d'Italia

=== 2017–present ===
The 2017 Giro d'Italia was the 100th edition of the race. Tom Dumoulin won stage 10, a 39.8-kilometre (24.7-mile) individual time trial (ITT) from Foligno to Montefalco, to take the overall race lead by 2 minutes and 23 seconds over Quintana. Dumoulin won Stage 14, which featured a mountain top finish at Santuario di Oropa to extend his lead over Quintana by a further 14 seconds. On Stage 16, Dumoulin experienced stomach problems and had to take a comfort break at the foot of the Umbrail Pass; none of the other contenders waited for Dumoulin and he finished more than two minutes down on stage winner Vincenzo Nibali, keeping his race lead by just 31 seconds over Quintana. Dumoulin defended his lead until the stage 19 mountain finish in Piancavallo, where he crossed the line over a minute behind Quintana, the new race leader. However, Dumoulin's performance on stage 21, a 29-kilometre (18-mile) individual time trial from Monza Circuit to Milan in which he finished second, took him from fourth to first place in the general classification. He was also the first Dutchman to win the overall in a Grand Tour since Joop Zoetemelk won the 1980 Tour de France.

In 2018 Simon Yates seemed to be in very good position to become the first British rider to win, winning three individual stages and holding the Maglia Rosa from Stage 6 onwards, with Dumoulin lying second overall for much of the race. However, on Stage 19, Yates cracked and Chris Froome then launched an audacious 80 km solo breakaway, attacking the small group of leaders including Dumoulin on the Cima Coppi of the 2018 Giro, the graveled climb of the Colle delle Finestre, he continued to extend his lead over the Sestriere and to the summit finish of Bardonecchia and overturned a more than three minute deficit to take both the pink jersey, the Cima Coppi prize and the mountains classification. The solo win, and the simultaneous implosion of Yates, who lost more than 30 minutes on the day having lost contact on the first climb of the day, was described as "one of the most extraordinary days in Giro d'Italia history". Froome became the first British rider to ever win the Giro, as well as the first rider since 1983 to hold all three Grand Tour titles simultaneously, as well as becoming the seventh man to have completed the career Grand Tour grand slam.

In 2019 Richard Carapaz, from Ecuador, became the first rider from his country to win the race.

In 2020, the COVID-19 pandemic forced the postponement of the Giro to October, marking the only time in history that the Giro was not raced in May or June. This race was won by Tao Geoghegan Hart, making him the second British rider to win the race; then in the 2021 edition Egan Bernal became the second Colombian to ever win and in 2022 Jai Hindley became the first ever Australian to win.

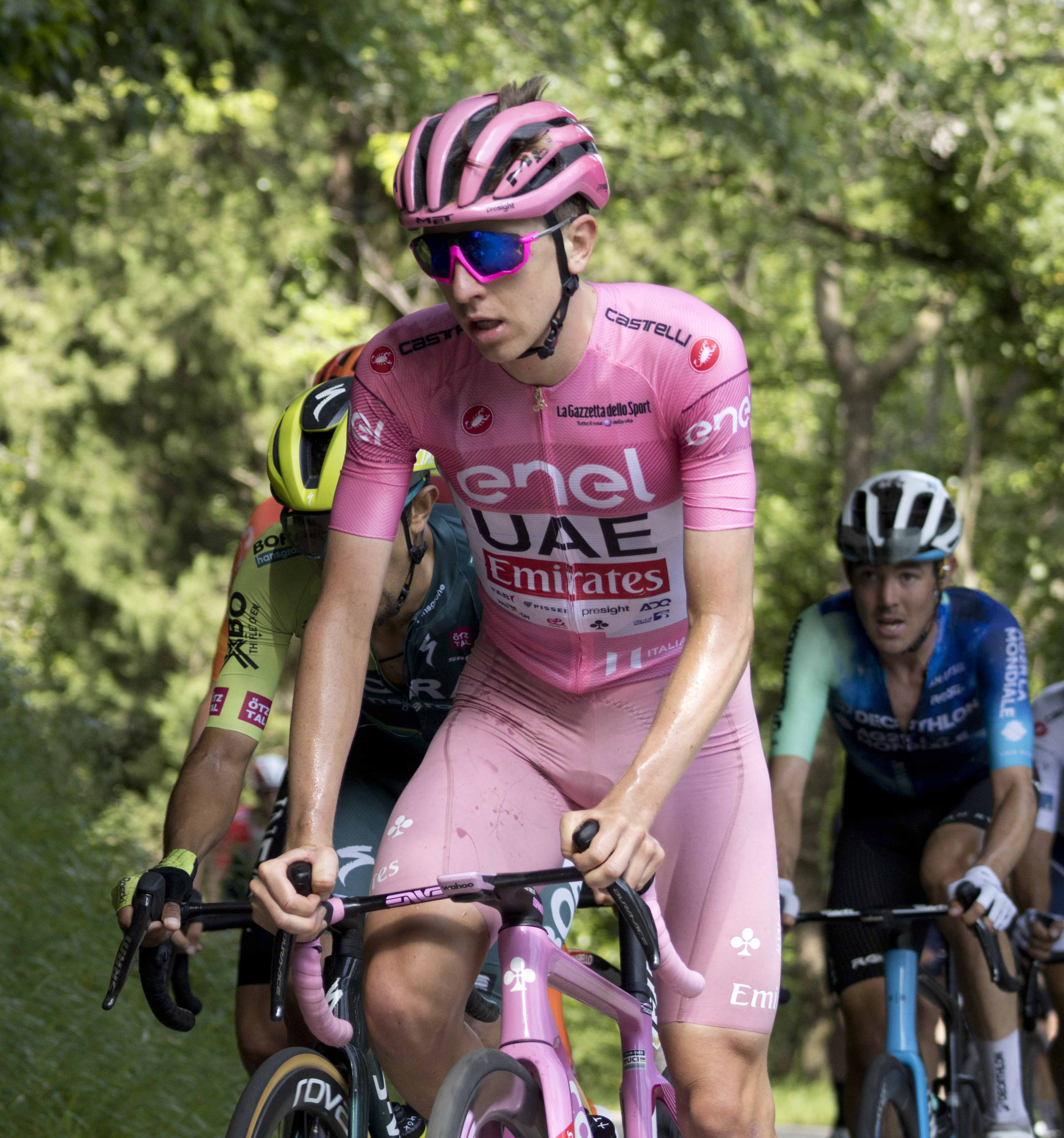
Tadej Pogačar wearing the Maglia Rosa at the 2024 Giro d'Italia

The 2023 Giro d'Italia was won by Slovenian Primož Roglič, who took the lead from Geraint Thomas on the penultimate stage, a mountain time trial to Monte Lussari, near the Italian border with Slovenia. Even though he suffered a dropped chain on the climb, Roglič was able to gain 40 seconds on Thomas to move into the overall lead. He held onto it on the final, largely ceremonial stage into Rome to win the Giro d'Italia for the first time in his career.

In 2024, Tadej Pogačar, from Slovenia, won the race on his debut. He narrowly lost out on the lead after the first stage to Jhonatan Narváez, but took the pink jersey on the second stage and held it until the end. Pogačar executed a dominant victory, with a winning margin of almost 10 minutes, the mountains classification and 6 stage wins. The winning margin of 9:56 over his closest competitor, Daniel Martínez was the biggest since the 1965 edition and the fourth largest in the post-World War II era. Pogačar went on to win the 2024 Tour de France, becoming the first rider to win both the Giro and Tour in the same year since Marco Pantani in 1998.

On the penultimate stage of 2025 Giro d'Italia, third-placed Simon Yates took the race lead by overturning a 1:21 minute deficit on UAE Team Emirates XRG's Isaac del Toro.

== Classifications ==
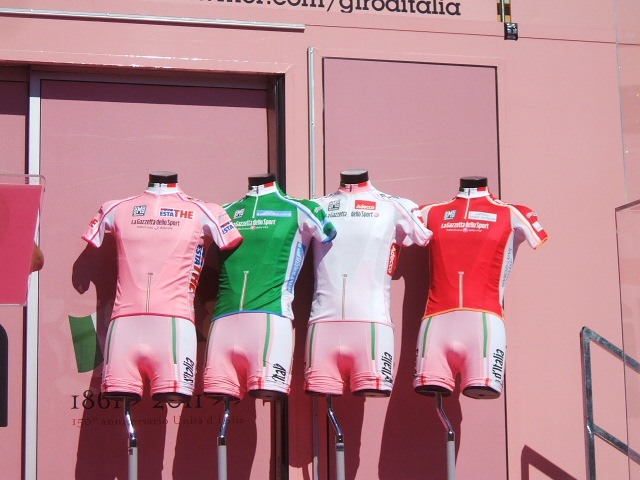
Jerseys of the 2011 Giro d'Italia

A few riders from each team aim to win overall but there are three further competitions to draw riders of all specialties: points, mountains, and a classification for young riders with general classification aspirations. The oldest of the four classifications is the general classification. The leader of each aforementioned classifications wears a distinctive jersey. If a rider leads more than one classification that awards, he wears the jersey of the most prestigious classification. The abandoned jersey is worn by the rider who is second in the competition.

=== General classification ===
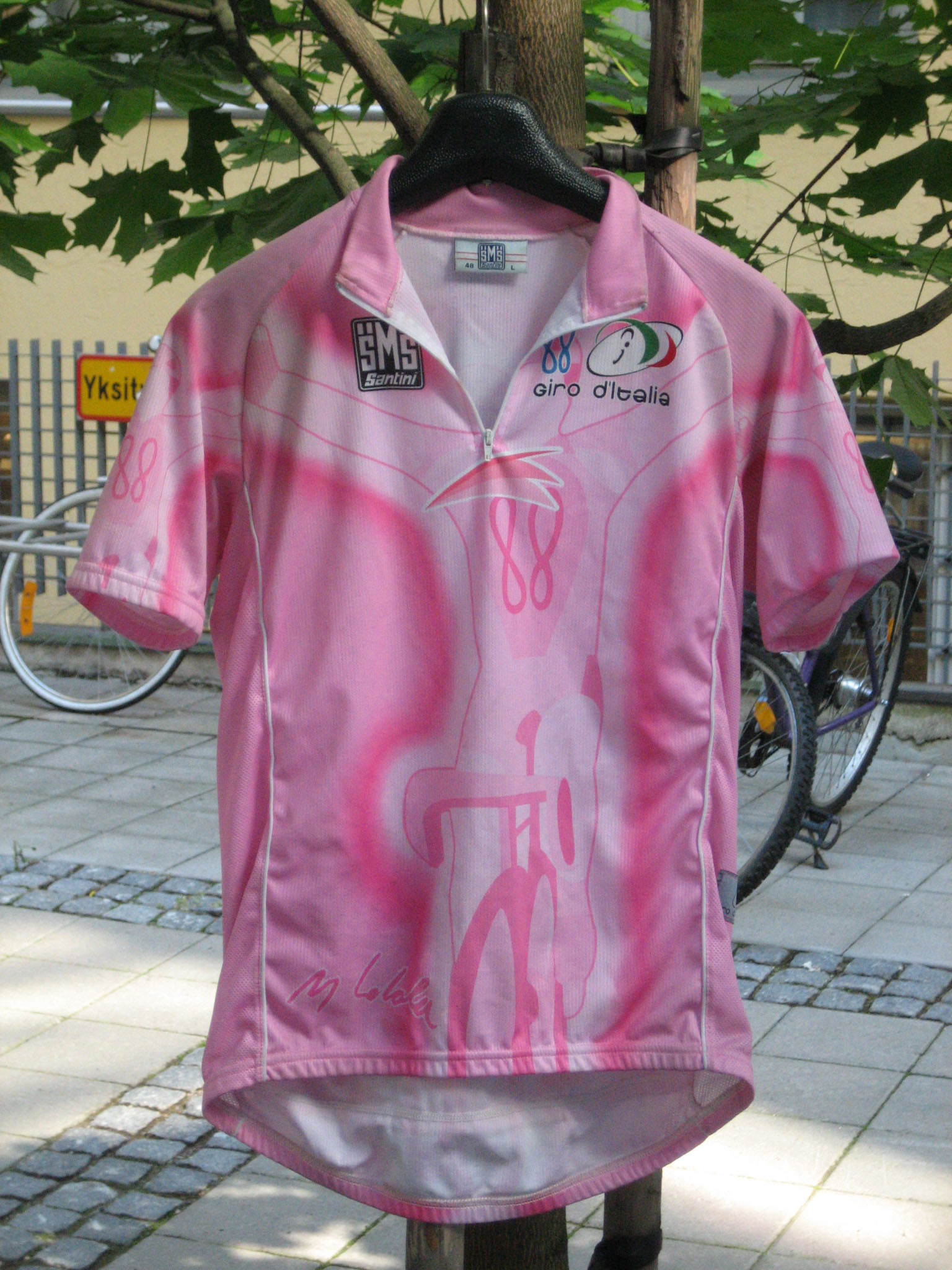
The Pink Jersey (Italian: Maglia rosa) worn by the leader of the general classification

The most sought after classification in the Giro d'Italia is the general classification. All of the stages are timed to the finish, and after finishing the riders' times are compounded with their previous stage times, so the rider with the lowest aggregate time is the leader of the race. The leader is determined after each stage's conclusion. The leader of the race also has the privilege to wear the race leader's pink jersey. The jersey is presented to the leader rider on a podium in the stage's finishing town. If a rider is leading more than one classification that awards a jersey, he will wear the maglia rosa since the general classification is the most important one in the race. The lead can change after each stage.

The color pink was chosen as the magazine that created the Giro, La Gazzetta dello Sport, printed its newspapers on pink paper. The pink jersey was added to the race in the 1931 edition and it has since become a symbol of the Giro d'Italia. The first rider to wear the pink jersey was Learco Guerra. Riders usually try to make the extra effort to keep the jersey for as long as possible in order to get more publicity for the team and the sponsor(s) of the team. Eddy Merckx wore the jersey for 78 stages, more than any other rider in the history of the Giro d'Italia. Three riders have won the general classification five times in their career: Alfredo Binda, Fausto Coppi, and Eddy Merckx.

The general classification winner was not always determined by a time system. In the inaugural Giro d'Italia the organizers chose to have a points system over a system based around elapsed time after the scandal that engulfed the 1904 Tour de France. In addition to that, the organizers chose the point system since it would be cheaper to count the placings of the riders rather than clocking the riders during each stage. The race leader was calculated by adding up each rider's placings in each stage and the rider with the lowest total was the leader; if a rider placed second in the first stage and third in the second stage, he would have five points total. The system was modified a year later to give the riders who placed 51st or higher in a stage 51 points and keep the point distribution system the same for the riders who placed 1st through 50th in a stage. The calculation remained unmodified until 1912 where the organizers chose to have the race be centered around teams, while still keeping the point system. The next year race organizers chose to revert to the system used in 1911. In 1914, the organizers shifted to the system used nowadays, where riders would have their finishing times for each stage totaled together to determine the overall leader.

These are the time bonuses that the riders receive for crossing the lines in the first few positions:

Type	1st	2nd	3rd
Flat finish	10″	6″	4″
Intermediate Sprint	3″	2″	1″

=== Mountains classification ===
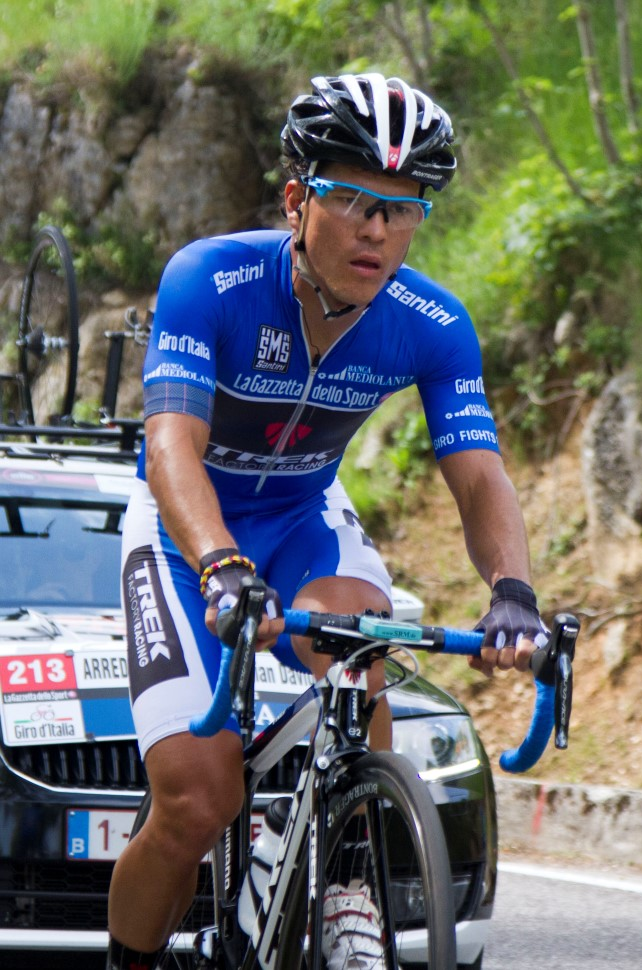
Julián Arredondo wearing the Blue Jersey at the 2014 Giro d'Italia

The mountains classification is the second oldest jersey awarding classification in the Giro d'Italia. The mountains classification was added to the Giro d'Italia in 1933 Giro d'Italia and was first won by Alfredo Binda. During mountain stages of the race, points are awarded to the rider who is first to reach the top of each significant climb. Points are also awarded for riders who closely follow the leader up each climb. The number of points awarded varies according to the hill classification, which is determined by the steepness and length of the course.

The climbers' jersey is worn by the rider who, at the start of each stage, has the largest number of climbing points. If a rider leads two or more of the categories, the climbers' jersey is worn by the rider in second, or third, place in that contest. At the end of the Giro, the rider holding the most climbing points wins the classification. In fact, some riders, particularly those who are neither sprinters nor particularly good at time-trialing, may attempt only to win this particular competition within the race. The Giro has four categories of mountains. They range from category 4, the easiest, to category 1, the hardest. There is also the Cima Coppi, the highest point reached in a particular Giro, which is worth more points than the race's other first-category climbs. Gino Bartali has won the mountains classification a record seven times.

The classification awarded no jersey to the leader until the 1974 Giro d'Italia, when the organizers decided to award a green jersey to the leader. The green jersey was used until 2012, when the classification's sponsor, Banca Mediolanum, renewed its sponsorship for another four years and desired the jersey to be blue rather than green.

The point distribution for the mountains is as follows:

The points that are gained by consecutive riders reaching a mountain top are distributed according to 5 categories:

Tipologia	1st	2nd	3rd	4th	5th	6th	7th	8th	9th
Cima Coppi	50	30	20	14	10	6	4	2	1
First Category	40 (50)	18 (24)	12 (16)	9	6	4	2	1	-
Second Category	18	8	6	4	2	1	-	-	-
Third Category	9	4	2	1	-	-	-	-	-
Fourth Category	3	2	1	-	-	-	-	-	-

The figures in brackets are awarded if the first category climb is also the stage finish.

=== Points classification ===
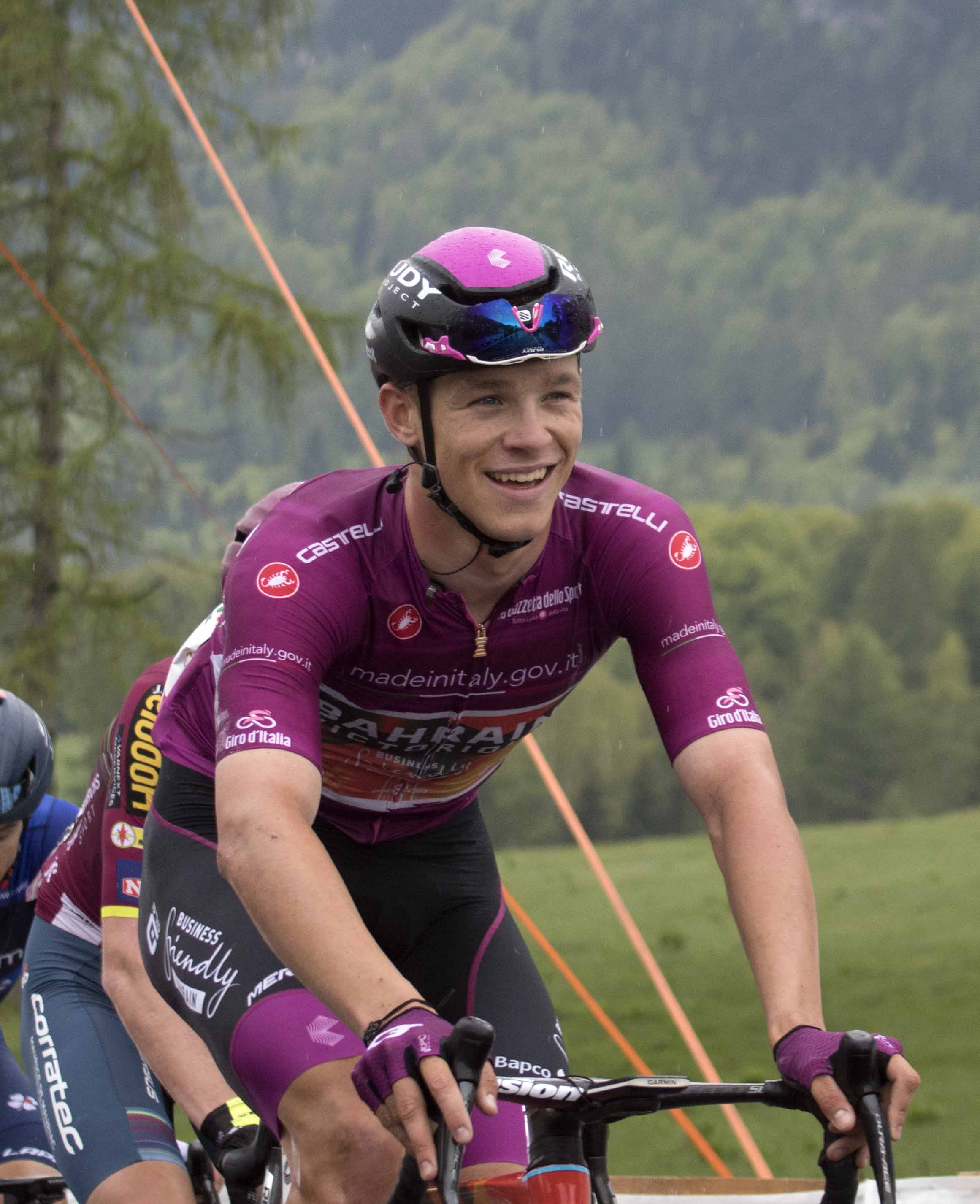
Jonathan Milan wearing the Maglia ciclamino at the 2023 Giro d'Italia

The points classification is the third oldest of the four jersey current awarding classifications in the Giro d'Italia. It was introduced in the 1966 Giro d'Italia and was first won by Gianni Motta. Points are given to the rider who is first to reach the end of, or determined places during, any stage of the Giro. The red jersey is worn by the rider who at the start of each stage, has the largest number of points. The rider who, at the end of the Giro, holds the most points, wins the points competition. Each stage win, regardless of the stage's categorization, awards 25 points, second place is worth 20 points, third 16, fourth 14, fifth 12, sixth 10, and one point less per place down the line, to a single point for fifteenth. This means that a true sprinter might not always win the points classification. The classification was added to draw the participation of the sprinters. The classification has been won four times by two riders: Francesco Moser and Giuseppe Saronni.

In addition, stages can have one or more intermediate sprints: 8, 6, 4, 3, 2, 1 point(s) are/is awarded to the first six cyclists passing these lines. These points also count toward the TV classification (Traguardo Volante, or "flying sprint"), a separate award.

The first year the points classification was used, it had no jersey that was given to the leader of the classification. In the 1967 Giro d'Italia, the red jersey was added for the leader of the classification. However, in 1969 the red jersey was changed to a cyclamen (purple) colored jersey. It remained that color until 2010 when the organizers chose to change the jersey back to the color red in a return to the original color scheme for the three minor classifications, which reflected the colors of the Italian flag. However, in April 2017 RCS Sport, the organisers of the Giro, announced that the maglia ciclamino would be revived for the 2017 Giro d'Italia.

The point distribution for the sprints are as follows:

Type	1st	2nd	3rd	4th	5th	6th	7th	8th	9th	10th	11th	12th	13th	14th	15th
Finish/Time Trial	25	20	16	14	12	10	9	8	7	6	5	4	3	2	1
Intermediate sprint	8	6	4	3	2	1									

=== Young rider classification ===
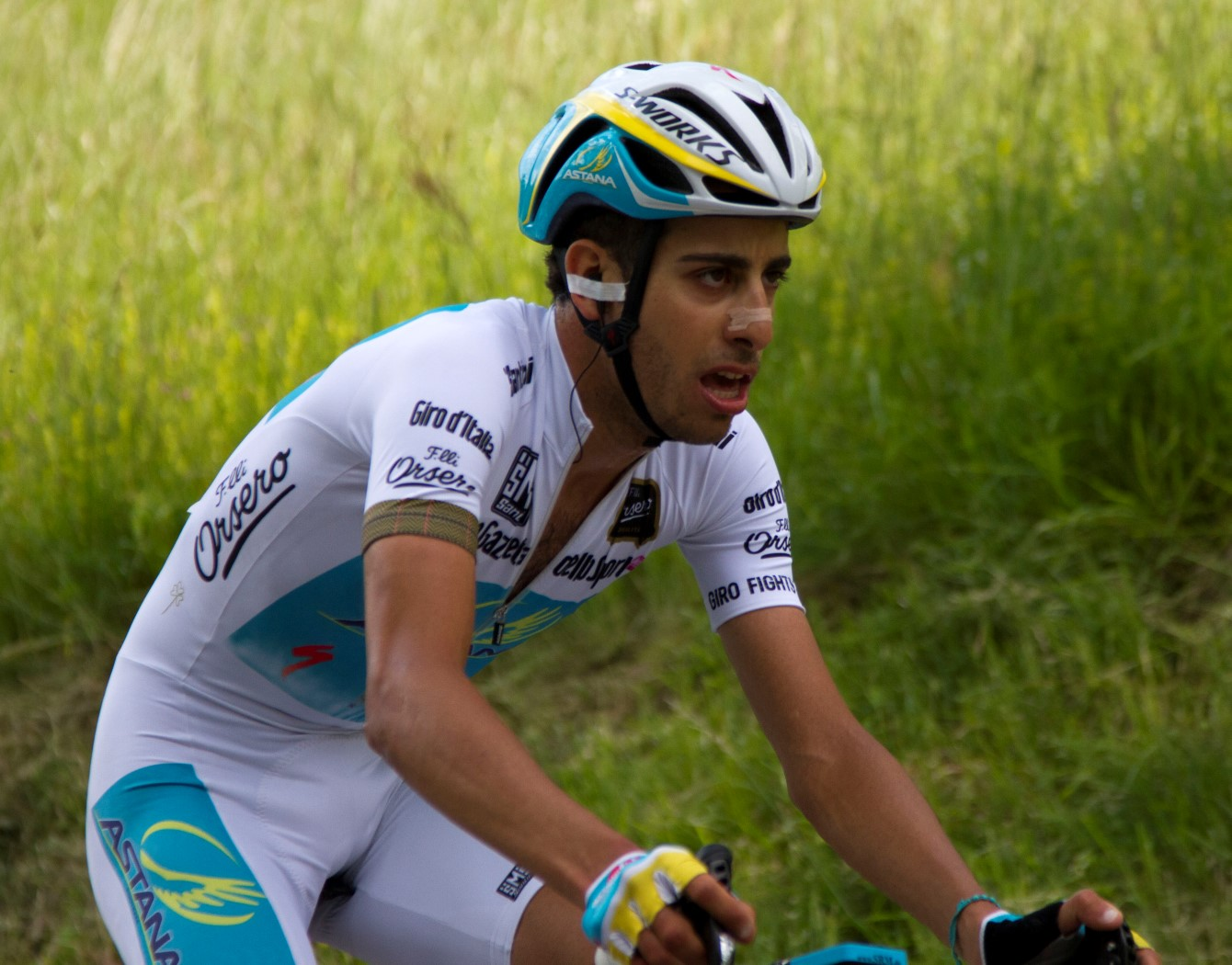
Fabio Aru wearing the White Jersey at the 2014 Giro d'Italia

The young rider classification is restricted to riders who are no older than 25 during that calendar year. The leader of the classification is determined the same way as the general classification, with the riders' times being added up after each stage and the eligible rider with lowest aggregate time is dubbed the leader. This classification was added to the Giro d'Italia in the 1976 edition, with Alfio Vandi being the first to win the classification after placing seventh overall. The classification was not contested between the years of 1995 and 2006. The classification was reintroduced in the 2007, and has been in each Giro since. The Giro d'Italia awards a white jersey to the leader of the classification. Evgeni Berzin, Nairo Quintana and Tao Geoghegan Hart won the young rider classification and the general classification in the same year : in 1994, 2014 and 2020. Four riders have won the young rider classification twice in their respective careers: Vladimir Poulnikov, Pavel Tonkov, Bob Jungels and Miguel Ángel López.

=== Team classifications ===
There are two team classifications that are contested at the Giro d'Italia: the Trofeo Fast Team and the Trofeo Super Team. The Trofeo Fast Team is the older of the two as it was introduced in the first Giro d'Italia. It was first won by Atala. The Trofeo Fast Team is determined by adding the times of the best three cyclists per team on each stage; the leading team is the team with the lowest total time. The classification was simply called the team classification in each edition until the organizers changed it to the Trofeo Fast Team for the 1994 Giro d'Italia. Team Sky won the Trofeo Fast Team classification in 2018.

The Trofeo Super Team was introduced at the 1993 Giro d'Italia. The name Trofeo Super Team was adopted for the 1994 edition of the Giro and been used ever since. The classification was first won by Ariostea in 1993. The classification is a team points classification, with the top 20 placed riders on each stage earning points (20 for first place, 19 for second place and so on, down to a single point for 20th) for their team. The Trofeo Super Team classification was discontinued in 2017, when it was won by Quick-Step Floors.

=== Minor classifications ===
Other less well-known classifications, whose leaders did not receive a special jersey, are awarded during the Giro. These awards were based on points earned throughout the three weeks of the tour. Each mass-start stage had one intermediate sprint, the Traguardo Volante, or TV. The TV gave bonus seconds towards the general classification, points towards the regular points classification, and also points towards the TV classification. This award was known by various names in previous years, and was previously time-based. In 2013 this classification was renamed to the sprints classification and was won by Rafael Andriato.

Other awards include the Combativity classification, which was a compilation of points gained for position on crossing intermediate sprints, mountain passes and stage finishes. It was won by Mark Cavendish in 2013. The Azzurri d'Italia classification is based on finishing order; however, points were awarded only to the top three finishers in each stage. It was also most recently won by Mark Cavendish. Additionally, the Trofeo Fuga Pinarello rewarded riders who took part in a breakaway at the head of the field, each rider in an escape of ten or fewer riders getting one point for each kilometre that the group stayed clear. Vini Fantini–Selle Italia's Rafael Andriato was first in this competition in 2013. Teams were given penalty points for minor technical infringements. Several teams tied for the Fair Play classification in 2018 (and also in 2021), not receiving any points (the team's best placed rider in the General Classification then serves as a tie-breaker).

=== Defunct classifications ===
In 1946 the maglia nera (black jersey) was introduced and awarded the cyclist who was last in the general classification. Riders sometimes deliberately wasted time in order to become last overall and so wear the black jersey. The classification was short lived, as it was last contested in the 1951 Giro d'Italia. The classification was won twice by Luigi Malabrocca, who won the classification in 1946 and 1947. The last winner of the maglia nera was Giovanni Pinarello.

The intergiro classification was introduced in 1989 and first won by Yugoslavian Jure Pavlič. In each stage there would be a point, before the finish, where the riders would be timed until they crossed the line. The times from each stage would then be added together for each rider to determine the leader of the classification. The leader of the classification was awarded a blue jersey. The classification was run each year since its addition until 2005. The last winner of the classification was Stefano Zanini. Fabrizio Guidi won the classification three times, the most by any rider. Guidi won the classification in 1996, 1999, and 2000.

There was also a combination classification that was introduced in the 1985 Giro d'Italia and was first won by Urs Freuler. The classification was discontinued after the 1988 Giro d'Italia. For the 1988 edition of the Giro, the classification awarded a blue jersey. However, the classification was reintroduced for the 2006 Giro d'Italia and was won by Paolo Savoldelli. The classification was not brought back in the 2007 Giro d'Italia.

== The race ==
The Giro d'Italia contains either 21 or 20 stages and a prologue (an individual time trial under 8 km (5 mi) in length) and two or three rest days. There are three types of stages that are used in the Giro d'Italia: the mass-start stages, individual time trials, and team time trials. The mass-start stages make up most of the 21 racing days of each year's Giro d'Italia, there are usually two time trials in each edition of the Giro d'Italia, and sometimes three if there is a prologue or team time trial. In mass start stages there are time bonuses of ten, six and four seconds for the first three finishers, and, in some years, bonuses of three, two and one seconds at intermediate sprints.

Italian sprinter Mario Cipollini holds the record of 42 stage victories.

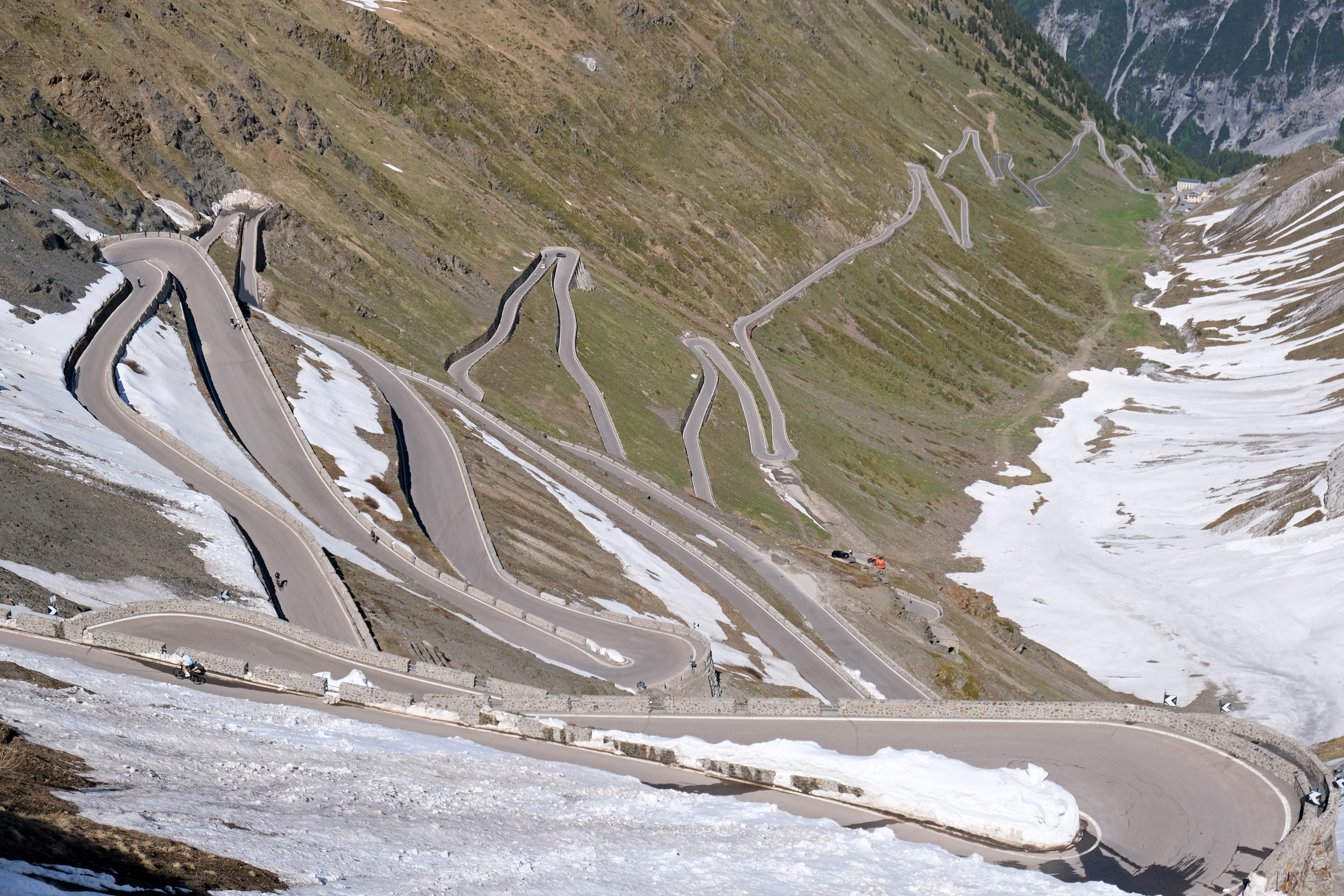
Some of the 48 hairpin turns near the top of the eastern ramp of the Stelvio Pass

The Giro d'Italia is known for its steep and difficult climbs. Each race features a few stages that contain many climbs of high severity. The race traditionally passes through the Alps with some of the longest climbs in the Dolomites. The first Alpine pass included was the Sestriere in 1911. The Dolomites were first included in the Giro in 1937, when the race crossed over the Rolle Pass and the Passo di Costalunga. Some of the most famous mountains used in the Giro are the Passo dello Stelvio, Passo Pordoi, and the Passo di Gavia. Since 1965 the highest point in the Giro d'Italia has been dubbed the Cima Coppi in honor of the great Italian climber Fausto Coppi.

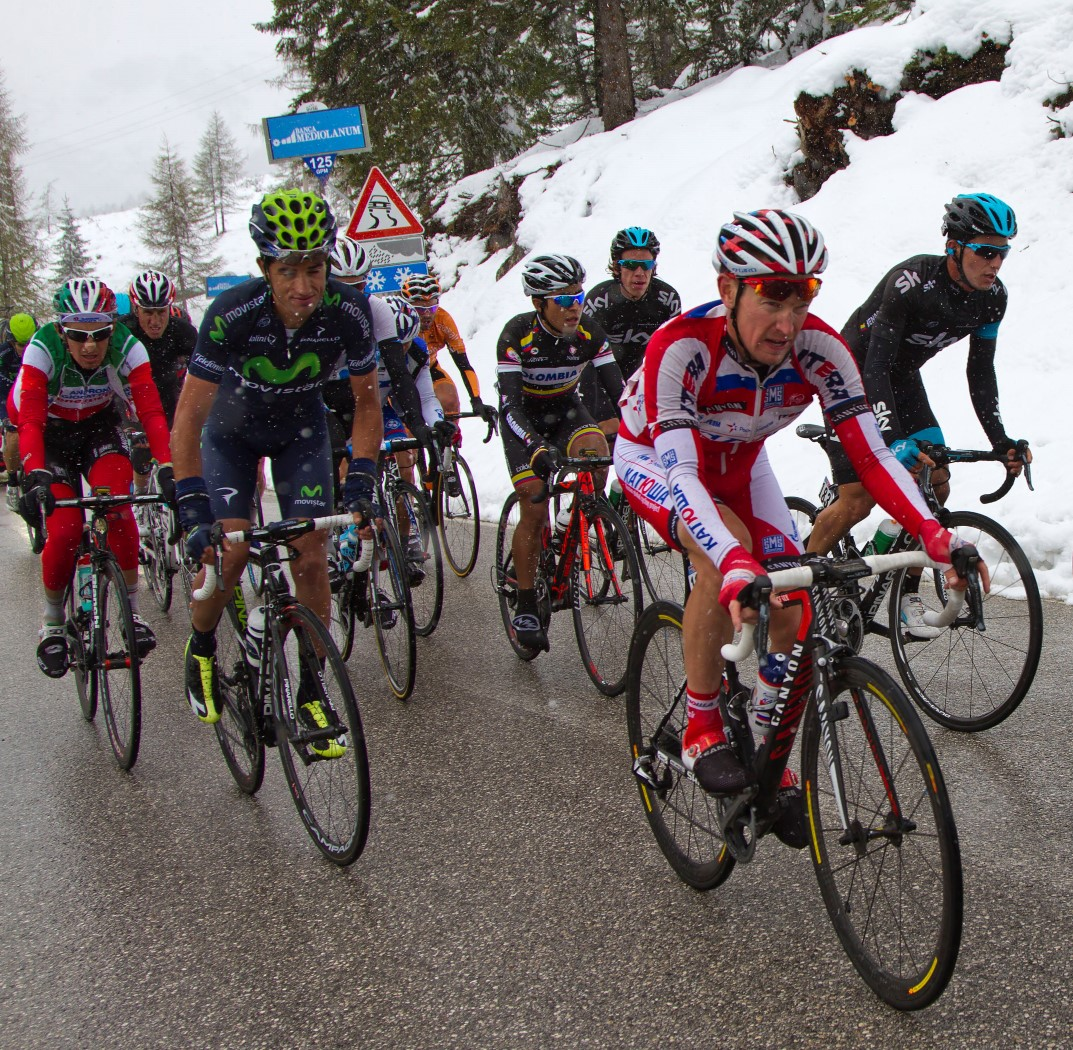
Riders at the 2013 Giro d'Italia faced snowy conditions whilst passing through the Alps.

The first Giro time trial was over 62 km (39 mi) between Bologna and Ferrara in 1933 and was won by Alfredo Binda. A time trial is sometimes used as the penultimate or final stage, and some editions have featured a mountain time trial stage. The first stage in modern Giros is often a short trial, a prologue, to decide who wears pink on the opening day. The first prologue occurred in the 1968 Giro d'Italia. The route stretched 5.7 km (4 mi) around the streets of Campione d'Italia and was won by the Frenchman Charly Grosskost. The riders raced the course in an unusual format, with the riders racing in ten groups of thirteen and the time not being counted towards their overall time.

The first team time trial occurred in the 1937 Giro d'Italia and was won by the Italian team, Legnano. The course was 60 km (37 mi) in length and stretched from Viareggio to Marina di Massa.

The Giro takes place mainly in Italy, but some stages have departure or conclusion locations in, or pass through, the neighboring countries of San Marino, France, Switzerland, Austria, Slovenia and Vatican City State. The other countries visited, usually in connection with the opening stages of the race, are Belgium, Bulgaria, Luxembourg, Croatia, Denmark, Ireland, Germany, Greece, Israel, Monaco, Netherlands, and the United Kingdom.

== The start and finish of the Giro ==
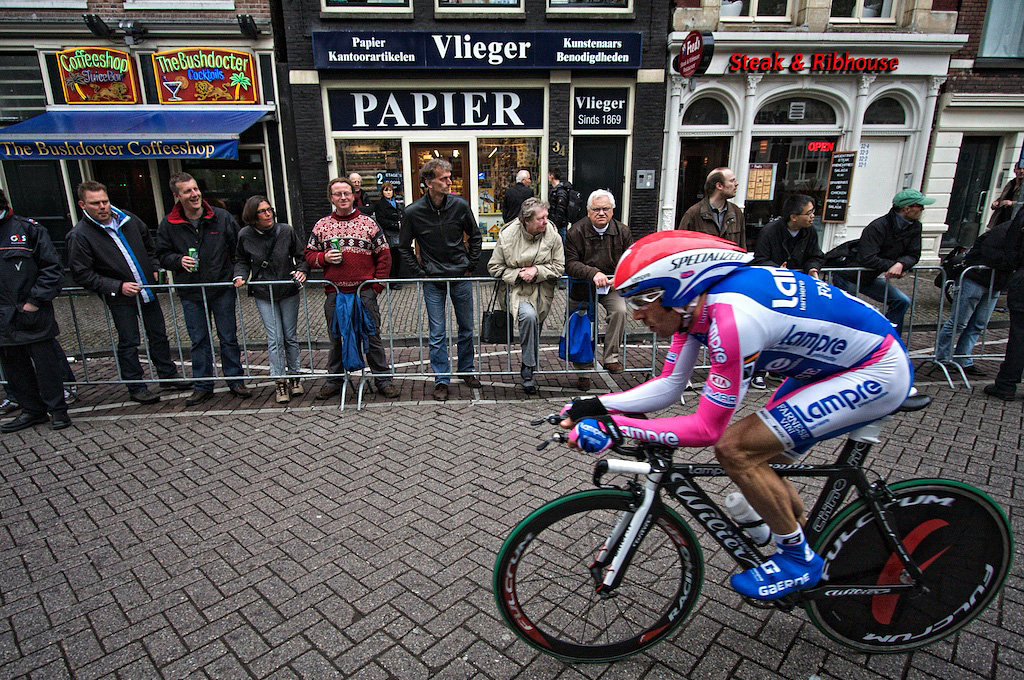
Gilberto Simoni in 2010 riding the stage 1 time trial that navigated through Amsterdam

For nearly half a century, the Giro started and finished by Milan, the city where the headquarters of the Gazzetta dello Sport is located. In 1911 these events took place in Rome to celebrate the 50th anniversary of Italy's unification. With the occasional exception, the start and finish in Milan were the standard for the Giro d'Italia. However, since the 1960s the place of departure has changed each year and finishes in cities such as Verona, Brescia, Trieste, Turin and Rome have become more frequent.

The start of the Giro d'Italia (La Grande Partenza) is a significant occasion and cities invest heavily, hoping to recoup the cost in tourism, exposure and other benefits: Denmark spent an estimated $3.86 million to host the opening stages of the 2012 edition.

Bulgaria spent an estimated €48.5 million to host the opening stages of the 2026 edition

=== Starts outside Italy ===
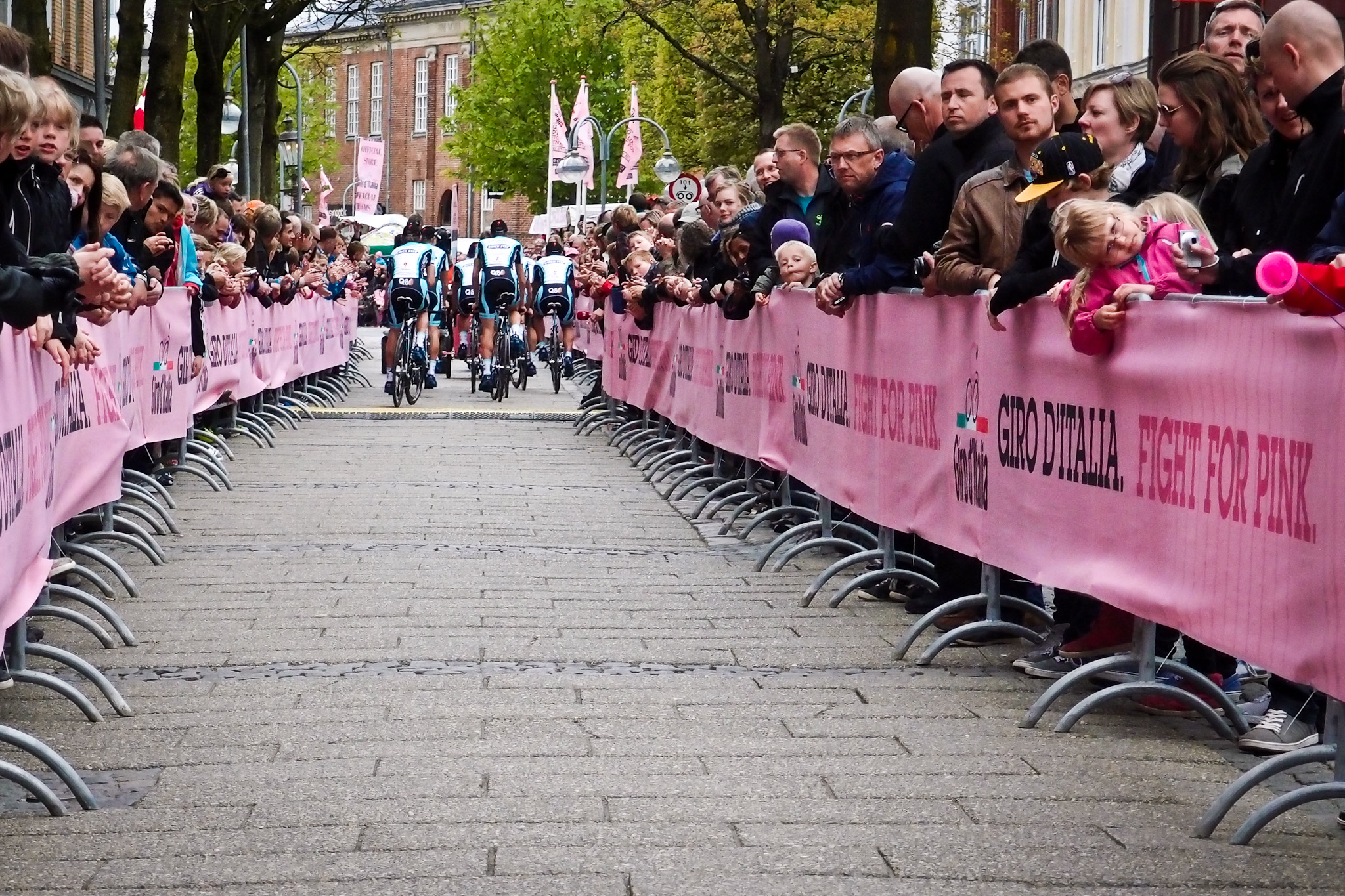
The Omega Pharma–Quick-Step team at the team presentation for the 2012 Giro d'Italia in Herning, Denmark

For the first 47 editions of the race, the race started on Italian soil. In 1965 the race made its first foreign start in San Marino, and has since had twelve more foreign starts. The 2018 start in Jerusalem was met with controversy as activists called for the race to be moved, claiming that the race whitewashes Israel's human rights record. Ultimately, the race went ahead as scheduled and every team selected for the Giro took part, including two teams of Arabic ownership: the Bahrain-Mérida team and the United Arab Emirates team. The intended start of the 2020 race in Hungary was cancelled due to the COVID-19 pandemic.

Foreign starts of the Giro
Year	City	Type	Ref.
1965	San Marino		
1966	(Monaco) Monte Carlo		
1973	(Belgium) Verviers	(Note: The prologue for the 1973 Giro d'Italia was not a typical prologue as it was a two-man team time trial, not the normal individual time trial. The results from the stage did not count towards the general classification, but were used to determine the first wearers of the maglia rosa (English: pink jersey) and maglia ciclamino (English: mauve, or purple, jersey). The rider with the quickest time of the two would wear the pink jersey, while the second placed rider wore the purple jersey. Merckx finished the fastest, which allowed him to wear the pink jersey the following day, while Swerts earned the purple jersey.)	
1974	Vatican City		
1996	(Greece) Athens		
1998	(France) Nice		
2002	(Netherlands) Groningen		
2006	(Belgium) Seraing		
2010	(Netherlands) Amsterdam		
2012	(Denmark) Herning		
2014	(Northern Ireland) Belfast		
2016	(Netherlands) Apeldoorn		
2018	(Israel) Jerusalem		
2022	(Hungary) Budapest		
2025	(Albania) Durrës		
2026	(Bulgaria) Nesebar		

== Media coverage ==
The Giro is broadcast throughout Europe, and also available in other areas throughout the globe:

- Europe: Eurosport
- Italy: Rai Sport
- France: L'Équipe TV
- United States: HBO Max

== Related events ==
A women's edition of the Giro – the Giro d'Italia Women – has been staged since 1988. Part of the UCI Women's World Tour, it is one of the longest races in women's professional cycling, usually taking place over eight to ten days. Since 2024, the race has been organised by RCS Sport, who also organise the men's race.

An under 23 edition of the Giro was first staged in 1970. Currently branded as Giro Next Gen, this race is also organised by RCS Sport.

== See also ==
- List of Giro d'Italia general classification winners
