= List of teams and cyclists in the 1910 Tour de France =

In 1909, although cyclists were able to register for the Tour with a sponsor, they were still considered to be riding as individuals. In the 1910 Tour de France, they competed for the first time in teams.

The cyclists were not so enthusiastic about the inclusion of the Pyrenées, and there were less participants: 110 instead of 150 in 1909. There were three teams with 10 cyclists each, including all the favourites for the overall victory: Alcyon, Le Globe and Legnano. The French team "La Française" decided not to join, but allowed their cyclists to ride for the Italian Legnano team. The other 80 cyclists rode as individuals, this was called the "isolés" category.

== Cyclists ==
=== By starting number ===
Legend
No.	Starting number worn by the rider during the Tour
Pos.	Position in the general classification
DNF	Denotes a rider who did not finish

No.	Name	Nationality	Team	Pos.	Ref
1	François Faber	Luxembourg	Alcyon	2	
2	Gustave Garrigou	France	Alcyon	3	
3	Louis Trousselier	France	Alcyon	DNF	
4	Octave Lapize	France	Alcyon	1	
5	André Blaise	Belgium	Alcyon	8	
6	Cyrille van Hauwaert	Belgium	Alcyon	4	
7	Marcel Godivier	France	Alcyon	DNF	
8	Georges Cadolle	France	Alcyon	DNF	
9	Édouard Léonard	France	Alcyon	DNF	
10	Aldo Bettini	Italy	Alcyon	10	
11	Lucien Mazan	France	Legnano	DNF	
12	Maurice Brocco	France	Legnano	DNF	
13	Jean-Baptiste Dortignacq	France	Legnano	DNF	
14	Maurice Decaup	France	Legnano	29	
15	Émile Georget	France	Legnano	DNF	
16	Constant Ménager	France	Legnano	18	
17	Pierino Albini	Italy	Legnano	11	
18	Ernesto Azzini	Italy	Legnano	13	
19	Luigi Azzini	Italy	Legnano	17	
20	Lauro Bordin	Italy	Legnano	DNF	
21	Omer Beaugendre	France	Le Globe	DNF	
22	Henri Cornet	France	Le Globe	16	
23	Georges Paulmier	France	Le Globe	12	
24	Alphonse Charpiot	France	Le Globe	DNF	
25	Julien Maitron	France	Le Globe	9	
26	Léon Lannoy	France	Le Globe	DNF	
27	Jules Deloffre	France	Le Globe	15	
28	Frédéric Saillot	France	Le Globe	20	
29	Charles Crupelandt	France	Le Globe	6	
30	Maurice Loit	France	Le Globe	DNF	
101	Louis Bonino	France	Lone rider	DNF	
102	Joseph Leblanc	France	Lone rider	22	
103	Augustin Ringeval	France	Lone rider	19	
104	Paul Amiot	France	Lone rider	DNF	
105	Noël Combelles	France	Lone rider	DNF	
109	Lucien Roquebert	France	Lone rider	34	
110	Charles Pavese	France	Lone rider	DNF	
111	François Lafourcade	France	Lone rider	14	
112	Lucien Leman	France	Lone rider	30	
113	Charles Cruchon	France	Lone rider	5	
114	Louis Faudon	France	Lone rider	DNF	
115	Emile Lamboeuf	France	Lone rider	DNF	
116	Eugène Leroy	France	Lone rider	DNF	
118	Ernest Paul	France	Lone rider	7	
119	Pierre Privat	France	Lone rider	DNF	
120	Paul Coppens	France	Lone rider	DNF	
122	Pierre Bordigoni	France	Lone rider	DNF	
123	Gabriel Mathonat	France	Lone rider	31	
125	Joseph Habierre	France	Lone rider	24	
126	Louis Picard	France	Lone rider	40	
127	Robert Charpentier	France	Lone rider	DNF	
128	Jean Riou	France	Lone rider	25	
129	Georges Fleury	France	Lone rider	23	
131	Emile Lamy	France	Lone rider	DNF	
133	Raphaël Galiero	France	Lone rider	DNF	
134	Paul Boillat	Switzerland	Lone rider	DNF	
135	Eugène Merville	France	Lone rider	DNF	
138	Achille Viollet	France	Lone rider	DNF	
139	Emile Abbeg	France	Lone rider	DNF	
141	Louis Jouin	France	Lone rider	38	
142	Frédéric Vaillant	France	Lone rider	DNF	
143	Henri Ory	France	Lone rider	DNF	
144	Georges Devilly	France	Lone rider	DNF	
145	Auguste Dufour	France	Lone rider	37	
146	Eugène Moura	France	Lone rider	DNF	
147	René Chaude	France	Lone rider	39	
148	Pierre Le Floch	France	Lone rider	DNF	
149	Pierre Desvages	France	Lone rider	DNF	
150	Pietro Ghislotti	Italy	Lone rider	33	
151	Albert Cognat	France	Lone rider	DNF	
153	Emile Godard	France	Lone rider	DNF	
154	Pierre Delplace	France	Lone rider	DNF	
155	Vicente Blanco	Spain	Lone rider	DNF	
157	Charles Clodi	France	Lone rider	DNF	
158	Albert Baudet	France	Lone rider	DNF	
159	Amédée Dutiron	France	Lone rider	DNF	
160	Henri Alavoine	France	Lone rider	DNF	
161	Georges Wagner	France	Lone rider	DNF	
162	Adrien Melaye	France	Lone rider	DNF	
163	Constant Collet	France	Lone rider	41	
164	Jean Perruca	Switzerland	Lone rider	DNF	
166	Louis Pennequin	France	Lone rider	DNF	
167	François Picolot	France	Lone rider	DNF	
168	Robert Jeannet	France	Lone rider	DNF	
169	Emile Besnier	France	Lone rider	DNF	
171	Albert Guillot	France	Lone rider	DNF	
172	Jules Defrance	France	Lone rider	DNF	
174	Adrien Heloin	France	Lone rider	DNF	
175	Edmond Héliot	France	Lone rider	DNF	
176	Georges Pasquier	France	Lone rider	DNF	
177	Jean Bouillet	France	Lone rider	27	
179	Célestin Guillermoz	France	Lone rider	DNF	
182	André Kuhm	France	Lone rider	DNF	
183	Auguste Guyon	France	Lone rider	26	
184	Georges Cauvry	France	Lone rider	36	
186	Joseph Wiringer	Belgium	Lone rider	DNF	
188	Camille Bière	France	Lone rider	35	
189	Robert Chopard	Switzerland	Lone rider	32	
190	Adolphe Hélière	France	Lone rider	DNF	
191	Raymond Didier	France	Lone rider	DNF	
192	Alexandre Rambaudi	France	Lone rider	DNF	
194	Maurice Pardon	France	Lone rider	21	
196	Lucien Pothier	France	Lone rider	28	
197	Pierino Fiore	Italy	Lone rider	DNF	
198	René Bartholet	France	Lone rider	DNF	
200	André Herbelin	France	Lone rider	DNF	
201	Charles Dumont	Switzerland	Lone rider	DNF	
202	Octave Doury	France	Lone rider	DNF	
203	Jean-Baptiste Camdessoucens	France	Lone rider	DNF	
206	Antoine Wattelier	France	Lone rider	DNF	
