= List of teams and cyclists in the 1909 Tour de France =

The winner of the previous two editions, Lucien Mazan "Petit-Breton", did not compete in the 1909 Tour de France. Petit-Breton expected his former teammate François Faber, who had become second in 1908, to win the race. Faber had transferred from the Peugeot team, that had dominated the 1908 edition, to the Alcyon team.

A new record of 150 cyclists started the race. The previous Tours had been successful, and similar races were initiated in other countries (most notably the Tour of Belgium, which started in 1908 and the Giro d'Italia, which started in 1909). The Tour de France was still the major race where the best cyclists came, and it was the first large-scale invasion of foreign stars. In total, 19 Italians, 5 Belgians, 4 Swiss, 1 German and 1 Luxembourgian started the race. Because cyclists could enter the race as sponsored cyclists, there were two classes of cyclists: cyclists with sponsors and cyclists without sponsors. There were seven different sponsors in the race (Nil-Supra, Alcyon, Biguet-Dunlop, Le Globe, Atala, Legnano and Felsina), with three to six cyclists. The majority of the cyclists, 112 in total, were not sponsored but were in the Isolé class, the class for cyclists without a sponsor.

== Cyclists ==
=== By starting number ===
Legend
No.	Starting number worn by the rider during the Tour
Pos.	Position in the general classification
DNF	Denotes a rider who did not finish

No.	Name	Nationality	Team	Pos.	Ref
1	Édouard Wattelier	France	Nil-Supra	DNF	
2	Henri Cornet	France	Nil-Supra	DNF	
32	Augustin Ringeval	France	Nil-Supra	DNF	
33	Jules Deloffre	France	Nil-Supra	16	
34	René Derche	France	Nil-Supra	DNF	
35	Ernest Ricaux	France	Nil-Supra	DNF	
3	Cyrille van Hauwaert	Belgium	Alcyon-Dunlop	5	
4	Louis Trousselier	France	Alcyon-Dunlop	8	
5	François Faber	Luxembourg	Alcyon-Dunlop	1	
6	Gustave Garrigou	France	Alcyon-Dunlop	2	
7	Paul Duboc	France	Alcyon-Dunlop	4	
8	Jean Alavoine	France	Alcyon-Dunlop	3	
9	Octave Lapize	France	Biguet-Dunlop	DNF	
10	Frédéric Saillot	France	Biguet-Dunlop	DNF	
11	Charles Cruchon	France	Biguet-Dunlop	DNF	
36	Odile Defraye	Belgium	Biguet-Dunlop	DNF	
37	François Leclerc	Switzerland	Biguet-Dunlop	DNF	
13	Georges Fleury	France	Le Globe	12	
14	Julien Maitron	France	Le Globe	11	
15	Constant Ménager	France	Le Globe	7	
16	Julien Gabory	France	Le Globe	DNF	
30	Lucien Pothier	France	Le Globe	DNF	
31	Léon Lannoy	France	Le Globe	DNF	
17	Luigi Ganna	Italy	Atala	DNF	
18	Luigi Chiodi	Italy	Atala	DNF	
27	Cesare Brambilla	Italy	Atala	DNF	
20	Carlo Galetti	Italy	Legnano	DNF	
21	Giovanni Rossignoli	Italy	Legnano	DNF	
22	Clemente Canepari	Italy	Legnano	DNF	
23	Mario Gajoni	Italy	Legnano	14	
24	Giovanni Marchese	Italy	Legnano	DNF	
25	Attilio Zavatti	Italy	Legnano	15	
28	Augusto Pasquali	Italy	Felsina	DNF	
29	Romano Puglioli	Italy	Felsina	DNF	
38	Ezio Corlaita	Italy	Felsina	DNF	
39	Ildebrando Gamberini	Italy	Felsina	18	
40	Angelo Magagnoli	Italy	Felsina	27	
41	Mario Neri	Italy	Felsina	DNF	
102	Alfred Le Bars	France	Lone rider	19	
103	Albert Lagarnier	France	Lone rider	38	
104	Alcide Riviere	France	Lone rider	41	
105	Joanny Michel	France	Lone rider	DNF	
108	Eugène Leroy	France	Lone rider	46	
109	Georges Bronchard	France	Lone rider	DNF	
111	Ernest Garnier	France	Lone rider	DNF	
112	Alcide Mornon	France	Lone rider	DNF	
113	Charles Delarbre	France	Lone rider	DNF	
116	Louis Delhumeau	France	Lone rider	DNF	
117	Georges Woiron	France	Lone rider	DNF	
118	Georges Devilly	France	Lone rider	55	
120	Frédéric Jardin	France	Lone rider	DNF	
121	Frédéric Rigaux	France	Lone rider	DNF	
122	René Chaude	France	Lone rider	33	
123	Henri Evesque	France	Lone rider	DNF	
124	Antoine Gregory	France	Lone rider	DNF	
126	Ferdinand Payan	France	Lone rider	DNF	
127	Léon Rabot	France	Lone rider	22	
128	Paul Boillat	Switzerland	Lone rider	31	
129	Jean Meziere	France	Lone rider	DNF	
130	André Herbelin	France	Lone rider	44	
131	Robert Charpentier	France	Lone rider	DNF	
132	Paul Pietrois	France	Lone rider	49	
133	Noël Combelles	France	Lone rider	DNF	
134	François Lafourcade	France	Lone rider	DNF	
135	Lucien Barroy	France	Lone rider	DNF	
137	Antoine Fauré	France	Lone rider	37	
138	Maurice Pardon	France	Lone rider	DNF	
139	Edmond Tavenet	France	Lone rider	DNF	
143	Léon Roullin	France	Lone rider	DNF	
144	Eugène Christophe	France	Lone rider	9	
146	Lucien Leman	France	Lone rider	21	
148	Eugène Ventresque	France	Lone rider	DNF	
150	Camille Mathieu	France	Lone rider	47	
152	Louis Constant	France	Lone rider	DNF	
153	Auguste Joos	Germany	Lone rider	DNF	
154	Joseph Habierre	France	Lone rider	17	
155	Alfred Vaidis	France	Lone rider	29	
156	Henri Ory	France	Lone rider	52	
157	Ernest Gilioli	France	Lone rider	DNF	
158	Rodolphe Meili	France	Lone rider	39	
159	Jean Perruca	Switzerland	Lone rider	45	
160	Charles Ponson	France	Lone rider	48	
161	Ernest Paul	France	Lone rider	6	
162	Lucien Grejaud	France	Lone rider	DNF	
164	Louis Gardent	France	Lone rider	40	
166	Joseph Beaugendre	France	Lone rider	DNF	
167	Hippolyte Veyssier	France	Lone rider	DNF	
168	Robert Lecointe	France	Lone rider	24	
169	René Fleury	France	Lone rider	DNF	
170	Léopold Dussuchet	France	Lone rider	DNF	
172	Eugène Merville	France	Lone rider	DNF	
173	Charles Lajus	France	Lone rider	DNF	
174	Octave Doury	France	Lone rider	DNF	
175	Lucien Colin	France	Lone rider	43	
176	Louis Ondet	France	Lone rider	DNF	
177	Louis Grasset	France	Lone rider	DNF	
178	Louis Chretiennot	France	Lone rider	DNF	
179	Raymond Lacot	France	Lone rider	DNF	
182	Louis Di Maria	France	Lone rider	50	
183	Auguste Denizot	France	Lone rider	35	
184	Emile Moulin	France	Lone rider	DNF	
185	Amédée Dutiron	France	Lone rider	25	
186	Aldo Bettini	Italy	Lone rider	10	
187	Pierre Desvages	France	Lone rider	DNF	
188	Edmond Laborde	France	Lone rider	DNF	
189	Joseph Troller	France	Lone rider	DNF	
190	Etienne Lempereur	France	Lone rider	DNF	
191	Alfred Faure	France	Lone rider	13	
192	Albert Guillot	France	Lone rider	DNF	
196	Auguste Dufour	France	Lone rider	36	
197	Armand Champeaux	France	Lone rider	DNF	
198	Alfred Guidez	France	Lone rider	54	
199	Paul Tixide	France	Lone rider	DNF	
202	Anton Jaeck	Switzerland	Lone rider	DNF	
203	Eloi Guichard	France	Lone rider	DNF	
204	Lucien Roquebert	France	Lone rider	DNF	
205	Louis Lavalette	France	Lone rider	DNF	
208	Amleto Belloni	Italy	Lone rider	32	
212	Henri Alavoine	France	Lone rider	30	
214	Maurice Petit	France	Lone rider	DNF	
216	Emile Lachaise	France	Lone rider	20	
219	Jules Fremont	France	Lone rider	DNF	
222	Pierre Langlade	France	Lone rider	26	
223	Fernand Lallement	France	Lone rider	DNF	
224	Henri Ganne	France	Lone rider	DNF	
225	Alexandre Gilles	France	Lone rider	DNF	
227	André Blaise	Belgium	Lone rider	DNF	
228	Christophe Laurent	France	Lone rider	DNF	
229	André Gerard	France	Lone rider	DNF	
230	Eugène Moura	France	Lone rider	DNF	
231	Ernest Fraisse	France	Lone rider	DNF	
232	Ernest Goujon	France	Lone rider	53	
233	Henri Anthoine	France	Lone rider	51	
234	Charles Ponscarme	France	Lone rider	DNF	
235	François Roche	France	Lone rider	42	
236	Alvise Pisoni	Italy	Lone rider	DNF	
237	Albert Chartier	France	Lone rider	DNF	
238	Joseph Leblanc	France	Lone rider	34	
239	M. Parel	France	Lone rider	DNF	
240	Marcel Hugot	France	Lone rider	DNF	
242	Augusto Rho	Italy	Lone rider	DNF	
244	Gabriel Magnant	France	Lone rider	DNF	
247	Georges Oudin	France	Lone rider	23	
249	Louis Faudon	France	Lone rider	DNF	
250	Georges Nemo	Belgium	Lone rider	DNF	
251	Albert Dupont	Belgium	Lone rider	DNF	
252	Pierre Proy	France	Lone rider	DNF	
253	Philippe Cordier	France	Lone rider	DNF	
254	Paul Chauvet	France	Lone rider	DNF	
256	Antoine Wattelier	France	Lone rider	28	
