= 1910 Tour de France, Stage 1 to Stage 8 =

Cycling race stages

Route of the 1910 Tour de France

The 1910 Tour de France was the 8th edition of Tour de France, one of cycling's Grand Tours. The Tour began in Paris on 3 July and stage 8 occurred on 15 July with a flat stage to Perpignan. The race finished in Paris on 31 July.

== Stage 1 ==
3 July 1910 — Paris to Roubaix, 269 km (167.1 mi)

Stage 1 result and general classification after stage 1

Rank	Rider	Team	Time
1	Charles Crupelandt (FRA)	Le Globe	8h 54' 00"
2	Cyrille van Hauwaert (BEL)	Alcyon	+ 20' 00"
3	Octave Lapize (FRA)	Alcyon	s.t.
4	François Faber (LUX)	Alcyon	s.t.
5	Charles Cruchon (FRA)	Lone rider	+ 21' 00"
6	Constant Ménager (FRA)	Legnano	+ 28' 00"
7	Pierino Albini (ITA)	Legnano	s.t.
8	Lucien Mazan (FRA)	Legnano	+ 29' 00"
9	Gustave Garrigou (FRA)	Alcyon	+ 30' 00"
10	Ernesto Azzini (ITA)	Legnano	+ 36' 00"

== Stage 2 ==
5 July 1910 — Roubaix to Metz, 398 km (247.3 mi)

Stage 2 result

Rank	Rider	Team	Time
1	François Faber (LUX)	Alcyon	13h 08' 00"
2	Gustave Garrigou (FRA)	Alcyon	+ 7' 00"
3	Octave Lapize (FRA)	Alcyon	+ 17' 00"
4	Cyrille van Hauwaert (BEL)	Alcyon	s.t.
5	Henri Cornet (FRA)	Le Globe	+ 25' 00"
6	Ernest Paul (FRA)	Lone rider	+ 29' 00"
7	Charles Cruchon (FRA)	Lone rider	+ 38' 00"
8	François Lafourcade (FRA)	Lone rider	+ 42' 00"
9	Marcel Godivier (FRA)	Alcyon	+ 46' 00"
10	Constant Ménager (FRA)	Legnano	+ 47' 00"

General classification after stage 2

Rank	Rider	Team	Points
1	François Faber (LUX)	Alcyon	5
2	Octave Lapize (FRA)	Alcyon	6
3	Cyrille van Hauwaert (BEL)	Alcyon	6
4			
5			
6			
7			
8			
9			
10			

== Stage 3 ==
7 July 1910 — Metz to Belfort, 259 km (161 mi)

Stage 3 result

Rank	Rider	Team	Time
1	Émile Georget (FRA)	Legnano	9h 07' 00"
2	François Faber (LUX)	Alcyon	+ 4' 00"
3	Gustave Garrigou (FRA)	Alcyon	+ 5' 00"
4	Henri Cornet (FRA)	Le Globe	+ 10' 00"
5	Cyrille van Hauwaert (BEL)	Alcyon	+ 14' 00"
6	Octave Lapize (FRA)	Alcyon	+ 20' 00"
7	Lucien Mazan (FRA)	Legnano	+ 24' 00"
8	François Lafourcade (FRA)	Lone rider	+ 25' 00"
9	Augustin Ringeval (FRA)	Lone rider	s.t.
10	Constant Ménager (FRA)	Legnano	+ 32' 00"

General classification after stage 3

Rank	Rider	Team	Points
1	François Faber (LUX)	Alcyon	7
2	Cyrille van Hauwaert (BEL)	Alcyon	11
3	Octave Lapize (FRA)	Alcyon	12
4			
5			
6			
7			
8			
9			
10			

== Stage 4 ==
9 July 1910 — Belfort to Lyon, 309 km (192 mi)

Stage 4 result

Rank	Rider	Team	Time
1	François Faber (LUX)	Alcyon	9h 44' 00"
2	Ernesto Azzini (ITA)	Legnano	s.t.
3	Louis Trousselier (FRA)	Alcyon	s.t.
4	Marcel Godivier (FRA)	Alcyon	s.t.
5	André Blaise (BEL)	Alcyon	s.t.
6	Aldo Bettini (ITA)	Alcyon	+ 1"
7	Luigi Azzini (ITA)	Legnano	+ 8' 00"
8	Frédéric Saillot (FRA)	Le Globe	s.t.
9	Gustave Garrigou (FRA)	Alcyon	+ 10' 00"
10	Henri Cornet (FRA)	Le Globe	+ 12' 00"

General classification after stage 4

Rank	Rider	Team	Points
1	François Faber (LUX)	Alcyon	8
2	Gustave Garrigou (FRA)	Alcyon	23
3	Cyrille van Hauwaert (BEL)	Alcyon	31
4			
5			
6			
7			
8			
9			
10			

== Stage 5 ==
11 July 1910 — Lyon to Grenoble, 311 km (193 mi)

Stage 5 result

Rank	Rider	Team	Time
1	Octave Lapize (FRA)	Alcyon	10h 43' 00"
2	Charles Crupelandt (FRA)	Le Globe	+ 2' 00"
3	Cyrille van Hauwaert (BEL)	Alcyon	+ 4' 00"
4	Lucien Mazan (FRA)	Legnano	+ 7' 00"
5	Jean-Baptiste Dortignacq (FRA)	Legnano	+ 17' 00"
6	François Faber (LUX)	Alcyon	+ 22' 00"
7	Gustave Garrigou (FRA)	Alcyon	+ 26' 00"
8	Aldo Bettini (ITA)	Alcyon	+ 29' 00"
9	Charles Cruchon (FRA)	Lone rider	s.t.
10	Georges Paulmier (FRA)	Le Globe	+ 30' 00"

General classification after stage 5

Rank	Rider	Team	Points
1	François Faber (LUX)	Alcyon	14
2	Gustave Garrigou (FRA)	Alcyon	30
=3	Cyrille van Hauwaert (BEL)	Alcyon	31
=3	Octave Lapize (FRA)	Alcyon	31
5			
6			
7			
8			
9			
10			

== Stage 6 ==
13 July 1910 — Grenoble to Nice, 345 km (214 mi)

Stage 6 result

Rank	Rider	Team	Time
1	Julien Maitron (FRA)	Le Globe	11h 46' 00"
2	Charles Crupelandt (FRA)	Le Globe	s.t.
3	André Blaise (BEL)	Alcyon	s.t.
4	Cyrille van Hauwaert (BEL)	Alcyon	+ 6' 00"
5	Gustave Garrigou (FRA)	Alcyon	s.t.
6	Lucien Mazan (FRA)	Legnano	s.t.
7	Ernest Paul (FRA)	Lone rider	+ 7' 00"
8	Octave Lapize (FRA)	Alcyon	+ 21' 00"
9	François Faber (LUX)	Alcyon	+ 26' 00"
10	Marcel Godivier (FRA)	Alcyon	+ 27' 00"

General classification after stage 6

Rank	Rider	Team	Points
1	François Faber (LUX)	Alcyon	23
2	Cyrille van Hauwaert (BEL)	Alcyon	35
3	Gustave Garrigou (FRA)	Alcyon	38
4			
5			
6			
7			
8			
9			
10			

== Stage 7 ==
15 July 1910 — Nice to Nîmes, 345 km (214 mi)

Stage 7 result

Rank	Rider	Team	Time
1	François Faber (LUX)	Alcyon	11h 48' 00"
2	Georges Paulmier (FRA)	Le Globe	+ 4' 00"
3	Octave Lapize (FRA)	Alcyon	s.t.
4	Louis Trousselier (FRA)	Alcyon	s.t.
5	Gustave Garrigou (FRA)	Alcyon	s.t.
6	Ernesto Azzini (ITA)	Legnano	s.t.
7	Marcel Godivier (FRA)	Alcyon	+ 4' 01"
8	Charles Crupelandt (FRA)	Le Globe	s.t.
9	Ernest Paul (FRA)	Lone rider	s.t.
10	Charles Cruchon (FRA)	Lone rider	s.t.

General classification after stage 7

Rank	Rider	Team	Points
1	François Faber (LUX)	Alcyon	24
2	Gustave Garrigou (FRA)	Alcyon	40
3	Octave Lapize (FRA)	Alcyon	45
4			
5			
6			
7			
8			
9			
10			

== Stage 8 ==
17 July 1910 — Nîmes to Perpignan, 216 km (134.2 mi)

Stage 8 result

Rank	Rider	Team	Time
1	Georges Paulmier (FRA)	Le Globe	6h 14' 00"
2	Julien Maitron (FRA)	Le Globe	s.t.
3	Octave Lapize (FRA)	Alcyon	+ 10' 00"
4	Cyrille van Hauwaert (BEL)	Alcyon	s.t.
5	Émile Georget (FRA)	Legnano	s.t.
6	Pierino Albini (ITA)	Legnano	s.t.
7	Charles Cruchon (FRA)	Lone rider	s.t.
8	Louis Trousselier (FRA)	Alcyon	+ 10' 10"
9	François Faber (LUX)	Alcyon	+ 17' 00"
10	Charles Crupelandt (FRA)	Le Globe	s.t.

General classification after stage 8

Rank	Rider	Team	Points
1	François Faber (LUX)	Alcyon	33
2	Octave Lapize (FRA)	Alcyon	48
3	Cyrille van Hauwaert (BEL)	Alcyon	56
4			
5			
6			
7			
8			
9			
10			
