= 1910 Tour de France, Stage 9 to Stage 15 =

Cycling race stages

Route of the 1910 Tour de France

The 1910 Tour de France was the 8th edition of Tour de France, one of cycling's Grand Tours. The Tour began in Paris on 3 July and Stage 9 occurred on 19 July with a flat stage from Perpignan. The race finished in Paris on 31 July.

== Stage 9 ==
19 July 1910 — Perpignan to Luchon, 289 km (180 mi)

Stage 9 result

Rank	Rider	Team	Time
1	Octave Lapize (FRA)	Alcyon	10h 53' 00"
2	Émile Georget (FRA)	Legnano	+ 18' 00"
3	François Faber (LUX)	Alcyon	+ 22' 00"
4	Charles Crupelandt (FRA)	Le Globe	+ 23' 00"
5	André Blaise (BEL)	Alcyon	+ 27' 00"
6	Georges Paulmier (FRA)	Le Globe	+ 31' 00"
7	Gustave Garrigou (FRA)	Alcyon	+ 38' 00"
8	Charles Cruchon (FRA)	Lone rider	s.t.
9	Ernest Paul (FRA)	Lone rider	+ 39' 00"
10	Luigi Azzini (ITA)	Legnano	+ 41' 00"

General classification after stage 9

Rank	Rider	Team	Points
1	François Faber (LUX)	Alcyon	36
2	Octave Lapize (FRA)	Alcyon	49
3	Cyrille van Hauwaert (BEL)	Alcyon	68
4			
5			
6			
7			
8			
9			
10			

== Stage 10 ==
21 July 1910 — Luchon to Bayonne, 326 km (202.6 mi)

Stage 10 result

Rank	Rider	Team	Time
1	Octave Lapize (FRA)	Alcyon	14h 10' 00"
2	Pierino Albini (ITA)	Legnano	s.t.
3	François Faber (LUX)	Alcyon	+ 10' 00"
4	Louis Trousselier (FRA)	Alcyon	s.t.
5	François Lafourcade (FRA)	Lone rider	s.t.
6	Charles Crupelandt (FRA)	Le Globe	+ 35' 00"
7	Charles Cruchon (FRA)	Lone rider	+ 50' 00"
8	Gustave Garrigou (FRA)	Alcyon	+ 56' 00"
9	Cyrille van Hauwaert (BEL)	Alcyon	+ 1h 20' 00"
10	André Blaise (BEL)	Alcyon	+ 1h 21' 00"

General classification after stage 10

Rank	Rider	Team	Points
1	François Faber (LUX)	Alcyon	36
2	Octave Lapize (FRA)	Alcyon	46
3	Cyrille van Hauwaert (BEL)	Alcyon	73
4			
5			
6			
7			
8			
9			
10			

== Stage 11 ==
23 July 1910 — Bayonne to Bordeaux, 269 km (167 mi)

Stage 11 result

Rank	Rider	Team	Time
1	Ernest Paul (FRA)	Lone rider	8h 12' 00"
2	Charles Cruchon (FRA)	Lone rider	s.t.
3	Luigi Azzini (ITA)	Legnano	s.t.
4	Charles Crupelandt (FRA)	Le Globe	s.t.
5	Émile Georget (FRA)	Legnano	+ 11' 00"
6	Pierino Albini (ITA)	Legnano	+ 36' 00"
7	Octave Lapize (FRA)	Alcyon	s.t.
8	Gustave Garrigou (FRA)	Alcyon	s.t.
9	Georges Paulmier (FRA)	Le Globe	s.t.
10	François Faber (LUX)	Alcyon	s.t.

General classification after stage 11

Rank	Rider	Team	Points
1	François Faber (LUX)	Alcyon	46
2	Octave Lapize (FRA)	Alcyon	53
3	Charles Cruchon (FRA)	Lone rider	84
4			
5			
6			
7			
8			
9			
10			

== Stage 12 ==
25 July 1910 — Bordeaux to Nantes, 391 km (243 mi)

Stage 12 result

Rank	Rider	Team	Time
1	Louis Trousselier (FRA)	Alcyon	13h 28' 00"
2	Cyrille van Hauwaert (BEL)	Alcyon	s.t.
3	Gustave Garrigou (FRA)	Alcyon	s.t.
4	Octave Lapize (FRA)	Alcyon	s.t.
5	Aldo Bettini (ITA)	Alcyon	s.t.
6	Constant Ménager (FRA)	Legnano	+ 1"
7	Pierino Albini (ITA)	Legnano	+ 8' 00"
8	Charles Crupelandt (FRA)	Le Globe	s.t.
9	Charles Cruchon (FRA)	Lone rider	+ 9' 00"
10	François Faber (LUX)	Alcyon	+ 11' 00"

General classification after stage 12

Rank	Rider	Team	Points
1	François Faber (LUX)	Alcyon	56
2	Octave Lapize (FRA)	Alcyon	57
3	Cyrille van Hauwaert (BEL)	Alcyon	87
4			
5			
6			
7			
8			
9			
10			

== Stage 13 ==
27 July 1910 — Nantes to Brest, 321 km (199 mi)

Stage 13 result

Rank	Rider	Team	Time
1	Gustave Garrigou (FRA)	Alcyon	11h 01' 00"
2	Julien Maitron (FRA)	Le Globe	+ 4' 00"
3	Ernest Paul (FRA)	Lone rider	+ 10' 00"
4	Cyrille van Hauwaert (BEL)	Alcyon	+ 12' 00"
5	Octave Lapize (FRA)	Alcyon	+ 14' 00"
6	Luigi Azzini (ITA)	Legnano	s.t.
7	Augustin Ringeval (FRA)	Lone rider	+ 18' 00"
8	Georges Paulmier (FRA)	Le Globe	+ 23' 00"
9	François Faber (LUX)	Alcyon	+ 24' 00"
10	Louis Trousselier (FRA)	Alcyon	+ 29' 00"

General classification after stage 13

Rank	Rider	Team	Points
1	Octave Lapize (FRA)	Alcyon	62
2	François Faber (LUX)	Alcyon	65
3	Gustave Garrigou (FRA)	Alcyon	89
4			
5			
6			
7			
8			
9			
10			

== Stage 14 ==
29 July 1910 — Brest to Caen, 424 km (263 mi)

Stage 14 result

Rank	Rider	Team	Time
1	Octave Lapize (FRA)	Alcyon	14h 38' 00"
2	Gustave Garrigou (FRA)	Alcyon	s.t.
3	Ernest Paul (FRA)	Lone rider	s.t.
4	François Faber (LUX)	Alcyon	+ 41' 00"
5	Georges Paulmier (FRA)	Le Globe	+ 1h 06' 00"
6	Cyrille van Hauwaert (BEL)	Alcyon	s.t.
7	Aldo Bettini (ITA)	Alcyon	s.t.
8	Charles Cruchon (FRA)	Alcyon	s.t.
9	Jules Deloffre (FRA)	Le Globe	s.t.
10	Pierino Albini (ITA)	Legnano	+ 1h 06' 01"

General classification after stage 14

Rank	Rider	Team	Points
1	Octave Lapize (FRA)	Alcyon	57
2	François Faber (LUX)	Alcyon	63
3	Gustave Garrigou (FRA)	Alcyon	78
4			
5			
6			
7			
8			
9			
10			

== Stage 15 ==
31 July 1910 — Caen to Paris, 262 km (163 mi)

Stage 15 result

Rank	Rider	Team	Time
1	Ernesto Azzini (ITA)	Legnano	8h 17' 30"
2	Ernest Paul (FRA)	Lone rider	s.t.
3	Constant Ménager (FRA)	Legnano	s.t.
4	François Faber (LUX)	Alcyon	+ 1' 50"
5	Aldo Bettini (ITA)	Alcyon	+ 12' 53"
6	Octave Lapize (FRA)	Alcyon	+ 16' 51"
7	Georges Paulmier (FRA)	Le Globe	+ 22' 30"
8	Gustave Garrigou (FRA)	Alcyon	+ 23' 24"
9	Charles Cruchon (FRA)	Lone rider	+ 23' 50"
10	Pierino Albini (ITA)	Legnano	+ 25' 20"

General classification after stage 15

Rank	Rider	Team	Points
1	Octave Lapize (FRA)	Alcyon	63
2	François Faber (LUX)	Alcyon	67
3	Gustave Garrigou (FRA)	Alcyon	86
4	Cyrille van Hauwaert (BEL)	Alcyon	97
5	Charles Cruchon (FRA)	Lone rider	119
6	Charles Crupelandt (FRA)	Le Globe	148
7	Ernest Paul (FRA)	Lone rider	154
8	André Blaise (BEL)	Alcyon	166
9	Julien Maitron (FRA)	Le Globe	171
10	Aldo Bettini (ITA)	Alcyon	175
