= Léon Lannoy =

French cyclist (1889–1914)

Personal information
- Born: Léon Auguste Élie Lannoy; 10 November 1889 Guemps, France
- Died: 29 August 1914 (aged 24) Laigny, France

Cycling career
- Sport: Cycling
- Discipline: Road
- Role: Rider

Professional teams
- 1909: Le Globe
- 1910: Le Globe–Dunlop
- 1911–1912: Individual

Léon Auguste Élie Lannoy (10 November 1889 – 29 August 1914) was a French professional road cyclist active from 1909 to 1914.

== Biography ==
Lannoy was born in Guemps on 10 November 1889, the son of Jacques Pierre Auguste Lannoy and Marie Élise Désirée Parisseaut. He worked as a remonteur (clock repairer) before taking up competitive cycling.

He was conscripted on 1 October 1910 into the 110th Infantry Regiment in Dunkerque, where he was assigned military number 227 at the Saint-Omer recruitment office. Almost a year later, he was promoted to the rank of soldat first class. At the outbreak of World War I in August 1914, he rejoined his original regiment. He was killed in action on 29 August 1914 during the Battle of Guise at Laigny in the Aisne. His death was officially recorded in Calais on 6 July 1915.

== Major results ==
1909
3rd Paris-Honfleur
1910
1st Paris-Calais

=== Grand Tour general classification results ===
Stage races	1909	1910
Tour de France	DNF	DNF

=== Classic cycle races results ===
Classic cycle races	1909	1910	1911	1912	1913
Paris–Roubaix	—	40th	—	46th	84th
Paris–Tours	13th	—	29th	25th	55th
Paris–Brussels	15th	16th	—	—	—
