= Alphonse Charpiot =

French cyclist (1879–1957)

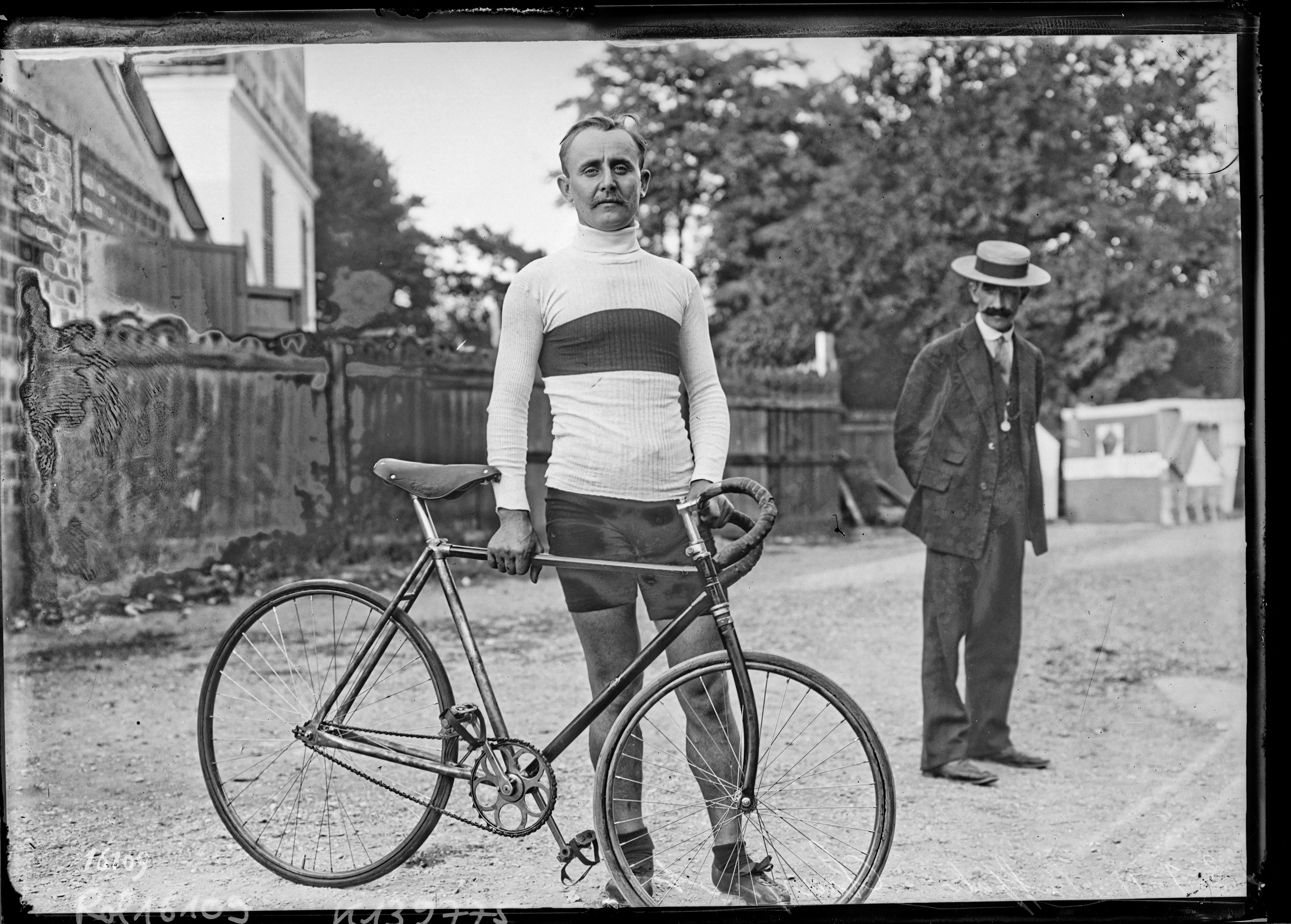
- Charpiot in 1911

Personal information
- Born: Alphonse Adrien Charpiot; 4 August 1979 or 20 October 1879 Lyon, France
- Died: 4 March 1957 or 3 October 1957 (aged 77)

Cycling career
- Sport: Cycling
- Discipline: Road
- Role: Rider

Professional teams
- 1908: Peugeot
- 1909–1910: Le Globe
- 1911: La Française
- 1912: Thomann

Major wins
- Dijon–Lyon – Grand Prix Wolber (1909)

Alphonse Adrien Charpiot (20 October 1879 or 4 August 1979 – 3 October 1957 or 4 March 1957) was a French professional road cyclist. He competed as a professional rider from 1908 to 1912.

== Career ==
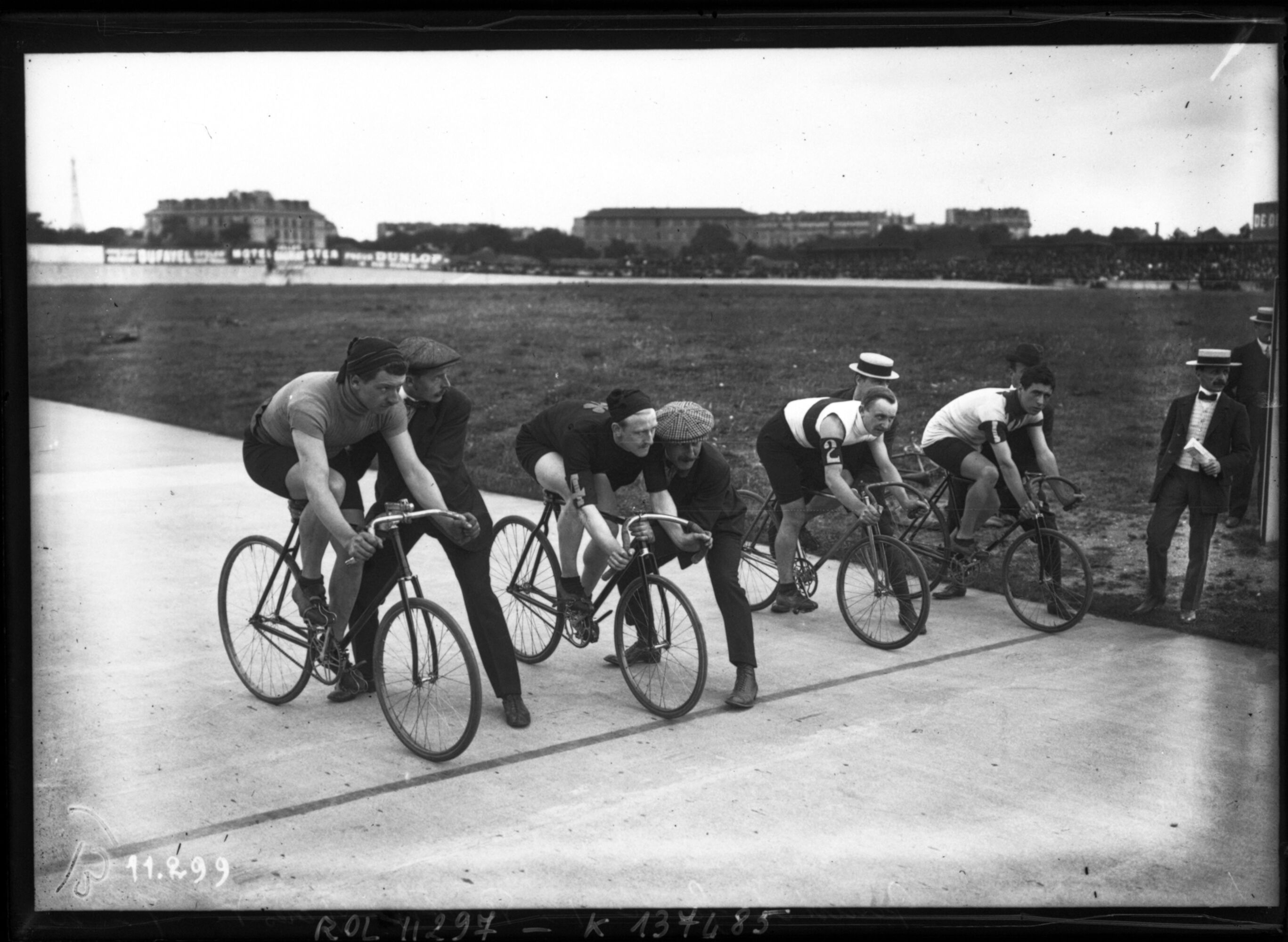
Charpiot at a race in September 1910

Charpiot was born in Lyon, France. He became Champion of Lyon. Due to his achievements he turned professional in 1908 and rode for teams including Peugeot, Le Globe, La Française, and Thomann.

He won in 1909 the race from Dijon to Lyon that was called later Grand Prix Wolber. His best career result came in 1911. Together with Octave Lapize he was minutes ahead in the 1911 Paris–Roubaix; but at the finisht he lost the sprint from Lapize finishing second in a cycling monument. He also competed in other main international cycling races, including participated in four editions of the Tour de France and finished 4th in Paris–Tours.

== Major results ==
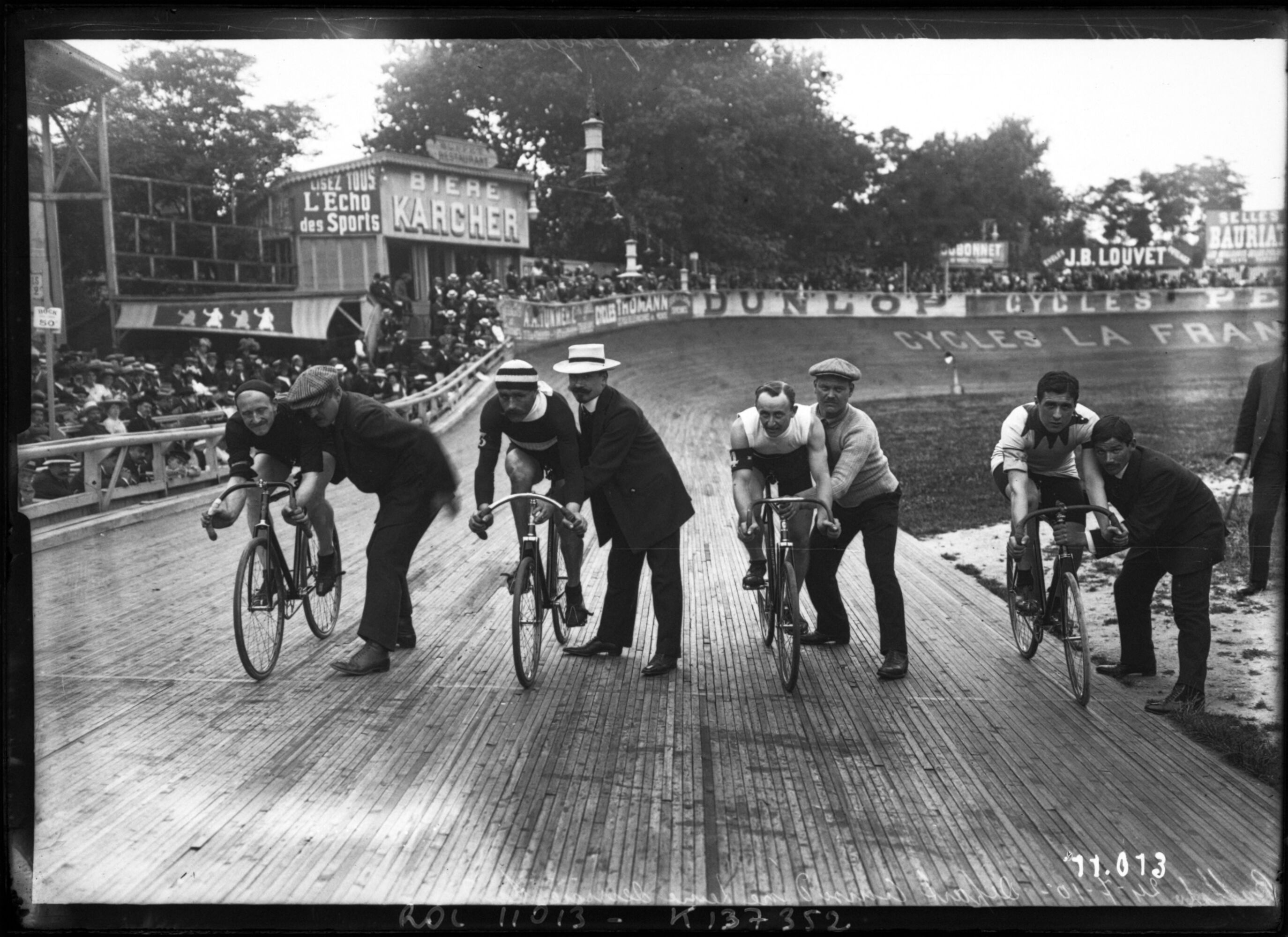
Charpiot at the start of a race in July 1910

1909
1st Dijon—Lyon (Grand Prix Wolber)

1910
6th Bol d'Or cycle race

1911
2nd Paris–Roubaix
4th Paris–Tours

1919
5th GP de la Loire

=== Grand Tour general classification results ===
Stage races	1908	1910	1911	1912
Tour de France	DNF	DNF	DNF	DNF

=== Classic cycle races results ===
Classic cycle races	1908	1909	1910	1911
Paris–Roubaix	—	—	36th	2nd
Milan–San Remo	—	DNF	—	—
Paris–Tours	15th	—	—	4th
