= Dieudonné Gauthy =

Belgian cyclist

Personal information
- Full name: Dieudonné Gauthy
- Born: 19 May 1893 Pepinster, Liège, Belgium
- Died: 24 January 1957 (aged 63) Clermont-sur-Berwinne, Liège, Belgium

Cycling career
- Sport: Cycling
- Discipline: Road
- Role: Rider

Professional teams
- 1911–1912: Individual
- 1913–1919: Alcyon
- 1920: Individual

Major wins
- Tour of Belgium (1913)

Dieudonné Gauthy (19 May 1893 – 24 January 1957) was a Belgian road racing cyclist who won the 1913 Tour of Belgium. During World War I Gauthy spent time captive in prison after having been involved in the battle of Liège in August 1914.

== World War I ==
During World War I Gauthy was part of a small battalion of bicycle scouts that was founded with the objective of acquiring information of German army movements in the area around Liège. In this role he was arrested several times by German soldiers patrolling the area. In the defense of the Fort de Fléron in August 1914 he had a narrow escape, as he was fired upon by German soldiers when he was just returning from reconnaissance ride. The bullit that was meant for him only hit the frame of his bicycle and Gauthy came away unharmed.

== Major results ==
1911
3rd Bruxelles-Liège
1912
2nd Antwerpen-Menen
2nd Bruxelles-Esneux
3rd Binche-Tournai-Binche
1913
Tour of Belgium

1st General Classification
1st Stage 6
2nd Stages 3 & 4
3rd Stages 1 & 5

1st Bruxelles-Oupeye
16th Paris-Roubaix
1914
8th Paris-Roubaix
Tour of Belgium

3rd Stage 1

1919
1st Retinne-Marche-Retinne
Tour of Belgium

1st Stage 2
1st Stage 3

11th Paris-Roubaix
