= François Lafourcade =

French cyclist (1881-1917)

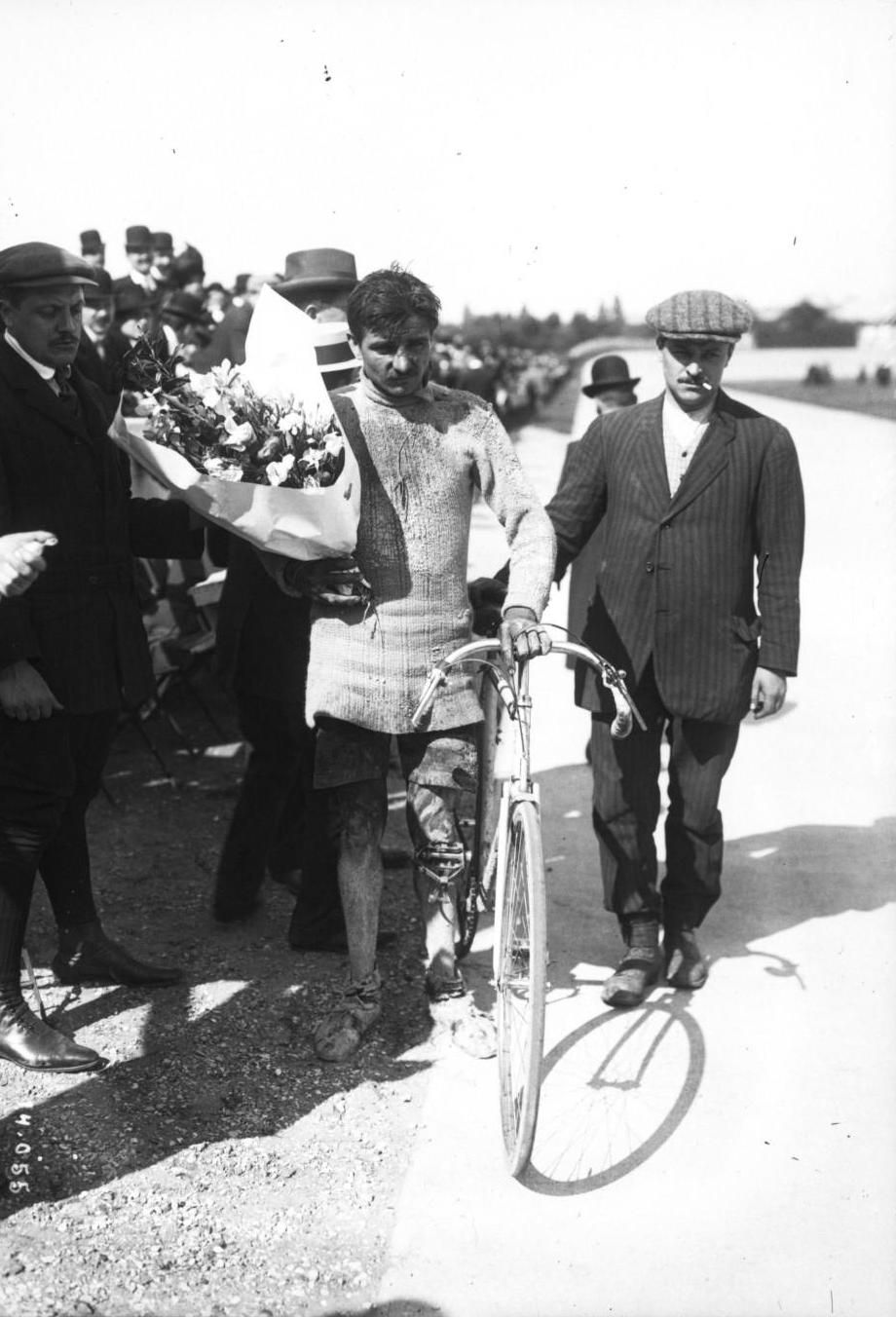
- François Lafourcade at the finish of the 1911 Bordeaux–Paris, where he placed 4th.

Personal information
- Full name: François Lafourcade
- Born: 8 November 1881 Lahontan, France
- Died: 10 August 1917 (aged 35) Eu, France
- Height: 160 cm (5 ft 3 in)
- Weight: 62 kg (137 lb)

Cycling career
- Sport: Cycling
- Discipline: Road
- Role: Rider

Professional teams
- 1907: Montabro
- 1908: Alcyon–Dunlop
- 1909: Biguet–Dunlop
- 1910: Panneton–Leman
- 1911: Monteil–Russian–America
- 1912: Automoto–Persan
- 1913: Celer–Continental

François Lafourcade (8 November 1881 – 10 August 1917) was a French professional road racing cyclist. He rode seven times the Tour de France and had among others five podium finishes in Bol d'Or and five top-10 achievements in Bordeaux–Paris. He was involved in the first known doping case in Tour de France history.

== Career ==
Lafourcade competed professionally from 1906 to 1912. His brother Ferdinand (born 1885) was also a professional cyclist from 1908 to 1911.

In the 1910 Tour de France, during the first major mountain stage (stage 9, Luchon to Bayonne), riders had to climb the Col de Peyresourde, Col d'Aspin, Tourmalet, and Aubisque. A local to the region, Lafourcade achieved a remarkable feat by reaching the summit of the Aubisque first, with a 15-minute lead over Octave Lapize. Exhausted by the effort, he stopped at the bottom of the descent, was caught by others, and finished fifth in the stage.

After his death, it was revealed that he had inadvertently poisoned fellow French rider Paul Duboc during the 1911 Luchon–Bayonne stage. The beverage was intended as a performance enhancer, a primitive form of what is now known as doping. This incident is considered the first known doping case in Tour de France history.

== Personal life ==
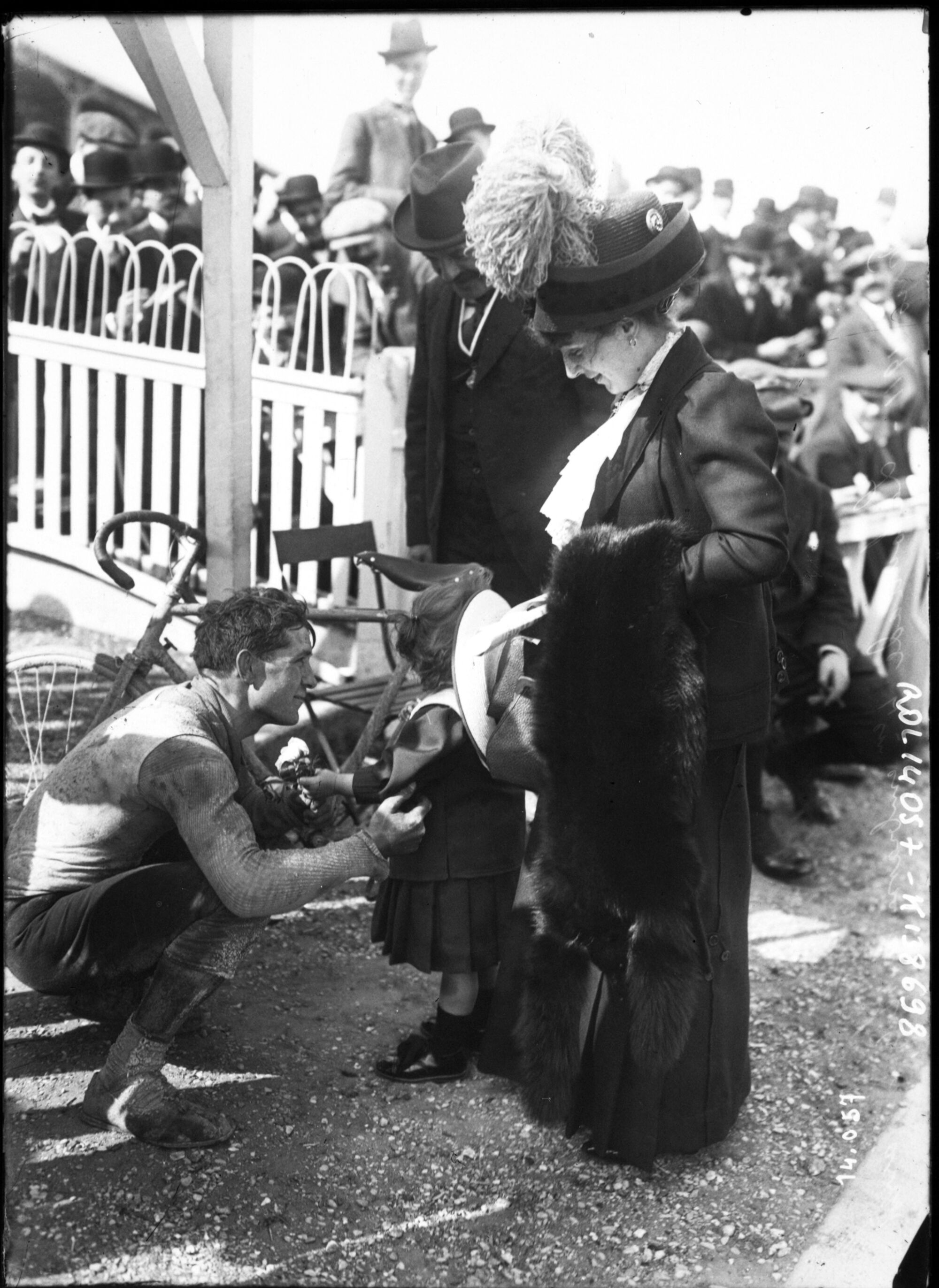
Lafourcade with his son in 1911

Lafourcade was born in Lahontan. He was a pilot during World War I. He died in Eu during the War.

== Major results ==
- 1907
  - 3rd – Bol d'Or
- 1908
  - 3rd – Bol d'Or
  - 9th – Bordeaux–Paris
- 1909
  - 3rd – Bol d'Or
  - 6th – Bordeaux–Paris
- 1910
  - 2nd – Bol d'Or
  - 5th – Bordeaux–Paris
- 1911
  - 4th – Bordeaux–Paris
  - 8th - Paris-Brest-Paris
- 1912
  - 2nd – Bol d'Or
  - 10th – Bordeaux–Paris

Grand Tour general classification results
| Race | 1906 | 1907 | 1908 | 1909 | 1910 | 1911 | 1912 |
| Tour de France | DNF | 13th | DNF | DNF | 14th | DNF | 29th |

Major Classic results
| Monument | 1908 | 1909 | 1910 | 1911 | 1912 |
| Paris–Tours | — | — | — | 13th | — |
| Paris–Roubaix | 18th | 33th | — | — | 38th |
| Classic | 1908 | 1909 | 1910 | 1911 | 1912 |
| Bordeaux–Paris | 9th | 6th | 5th | 4th | 10th |
| Paris–Brussels | 17th | — | — | — | — |
| Paris–Brest–Paris | — | — | — | 8th | — |
