= André Blaise =

Belgian cyclist

Personal information
- Born: 10 January 1888 Soumagne, Belgium
- Died: 23 May 1941 (aged 53) Verviers, Belgium

Cycling career
- Sport: Cycling
- Discipline: Road
- Role: Rider

Professional teams
- 1907–1908: Individual
- 1909–1910: Royal Saroléa; Alcyon
- 1911–1912: Alcyon
- 1913: Alcyon; Armor
- 1914: Automoto-Continental
- 1920–1922: Individual

André Blaise (10 January 1888 – 23 May 1941) was a Belgian professional road racing cyclist. He was active between 1907 and 1922.

== Career ==
Blaise began his career in 1907. His career includes 10 wins between 1908 and 1911, with his most notable victory a stage in the 1911 Tour of Belgium. He achieved seven top-10 results in the classic cycling races like a third place in 1913 Liège–Bastogne–Liège. He competed in the Tour de France five times, achieving his best result with an 8th place overall in the 1910 Tour de France edition. He was regarded as a “popular” cyclist.

After World War I, Blaise continued racing as an individual and achieved a 12th place finish in the Tour of Flanders in 1920.

He was killed during World War II due to an accident in a descent on 23 May 1941 at the age of 53.

== Palmarès ==
1908
Arlon–Aywaille
Blégny–Sint-Truiden–Blégny
Brussel–Micheroux
Huy-Vervier
Criterium of Liège

1910
Heuseux–Namur–Heuseux
Soumagne–Bastogne–Soumagne

1911
Stage 4, Tour of Belgium

1914
Grand Prix de Châteaurenard

Grand Tour general classification results
Race	1909	1910	1911	1912	1914
Tour de France	DNF	8th	DNF	DNF	DNF

Major Classic results
Races	1909	1910	1911	1912	1913	1914	1920	1921
Milan–San Remo	—	—	11th	5th	10th	—	—	—
Tour of Flanders	—	—	—	—	—	—	12th	—
Paris–Roubaix	19th	30th	19th	—	10th	—	—	—
Liège–Bastogne–Liège	—	—	—	3rd	—	—	—	26th
Paris–Brussels	20th	7th	—	—	—	5th	—	—
Paris–Tours	—	—	—	—	25th	—	—	—
