= François Leclerc =

Swiss cyclist (1877–1957)

Personal information
- Born: 22 April 1877 Lyon, France
- Died: 13 May 1957 (aged 80)

Cycling career
- Sport: Cycling
- Discipline: Road
- Role: Rider

Professional team
- 1909: Biguet-Dunlop

François Leclerc (22 April 1877 – 13 May 1957) was a French-born Swiss professional road cyclist active during the early 20th century.

== Biography ==
Was born in Lyon in France on 22 April 1877. He competed professionally in 1909 with the Biguet–Dunlop team. His best achievements were the second place in Bern-Geneve and the third place in the Tour du lac Léman. He also competed at other main cycling races, including the 1909 Tour de France. He died on 13 May 1957 at the age of 80.

== Major results ==
1909
3rd Tour du lac Léman
2nd Bern-Geneva

=== Grand Tour general classification results ===
Race	1909
Giro d'Italia	—
Tour de France	DNF (stage 2)

== See also ==
- List of teams and cyclists in the 1909 Tour de France
