= 1910 Tour de France =

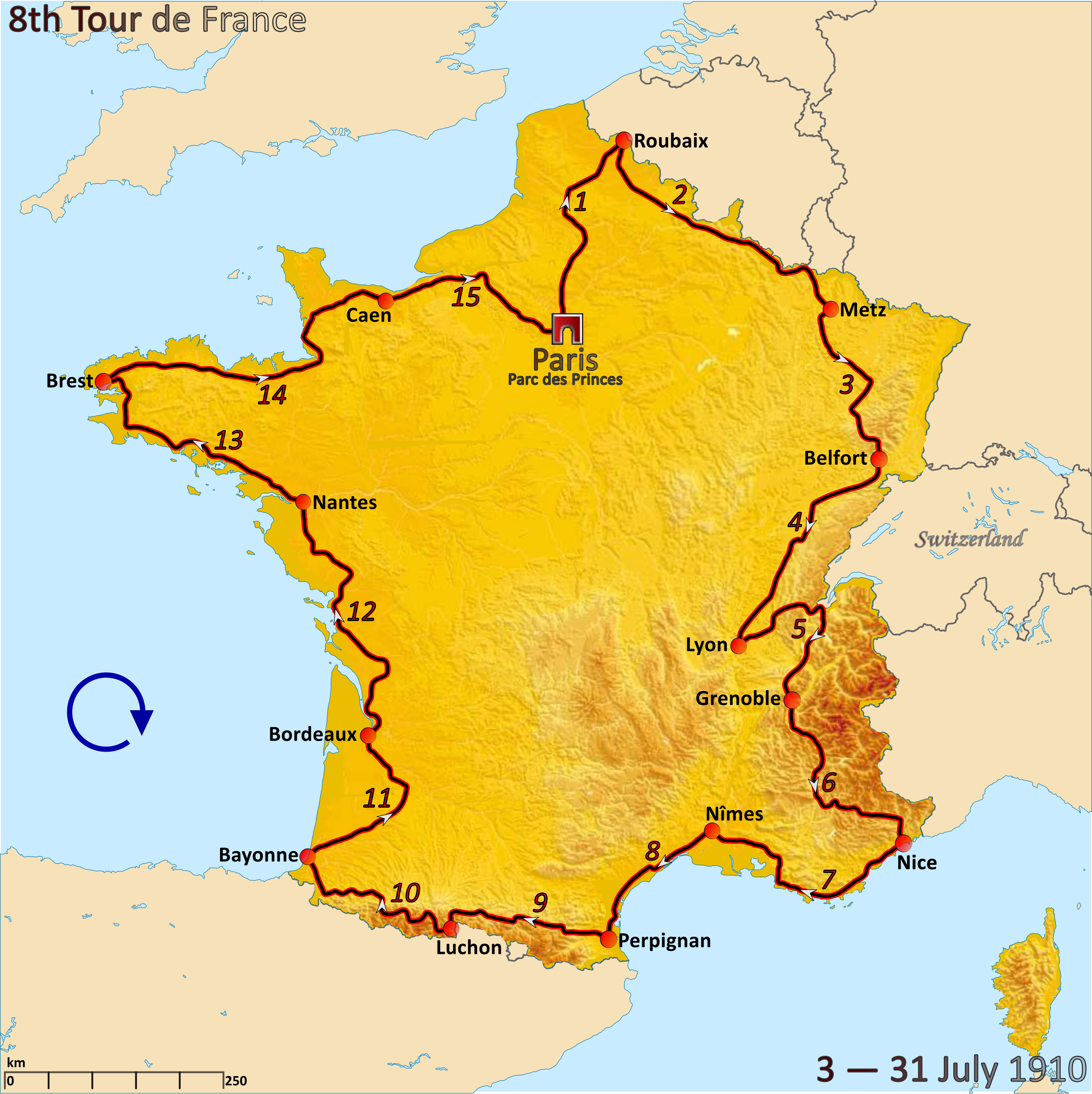
- Route of the 1910 Tour de France followed clockwise, starting in Paris

Race details
- Dates: 3–31 July 1910
- Stages: 15
- Distance: 4,734 km (2,942 mi)
- Winning time: 63 points

Results
	Winner	Octave Lapize (FRA)
	Second	François Faber (LUX)
	Third	Gustave Garrigou (FRA)

The 1910 Tour de France was the eighth edition of the Tour de France, taking place 3 to 31 July. It consisted of 15 stages over 4,734 kilometres (2,942 mi), ridden at an average speed of 28.680 km/h. It was the first Tour to enter the Pyrenees mountains. Two main candidates for the victory were 1909 winner François Faber, a sprinter, and Octave Lapize, a climber, both members of the powerful Alcyon team. Because of the points system, their chances for the overall victory were approximately equal. The race was not decided until the final stage, after which Lapize had won by a difference of only four points.

== Innovations and changes ==
The courses of the Tour de France in 1907, 1908 and 1909 had been nearly identical. In 1910, the Pyrenees were included, an initiative from Adolphe Steinès, who had drawn the course for the Tour de France since the first Tour in 1903. Compared to the 1907, 1908 and 1909 Tours, the stages Nîmes-Toulouse and Toulouse-Bayonne were replaced by three stages, Nîmes–Perpignan, Perpignan–Luchon and Luchon–Bayonne.

Tour organiser Henri Desgrange at first refused the inclusion of the Pyrenees, but later gave in and sent Steinès to the Pyrenees to see if it was possible to send cyclists up the mountains. Steinès encountered many difficulties. He went there at 27 January 1910, and asked an innkeeper for directions over the Tourmalet. The innkeeper replied that it is barely crossable in July, so practically impossible in January. Steinès hired a car anyway and rode up the mountain. Close to the top, there was so much snow that the car could not go further, and he continued on foot. Steinès walked during the night, and fell down a ravine. At 3 a.m. he was found by a search party. He quickly got some food and a hot bath. The next morning, he sent a positive telegram to Desgrange: "Have crossed the Tourmalet on foot STOP Road passable to vehicles STOP No snow STOP".

When it was announced that the Pyrenees were included in the race, 136 cyclists had entered the race. After the news, 26 cyclists removed themselves from the starting list. Other newspapers reacted to the Tour's route as "dangerous" and "bizarre".

Also new in 1910 was the broom wagon, to pick up the cyclists that abandoned during the race. This was a reaction of the Tour organisers to the criticism of the cyclists, many cycling independently with no team support, on the difficult mountains. It was designed to prevent riders from cheating, by using other forms of transport. In the tenth stage, over the four mountains in the Pyrenees, cyclists were allowed to finish the stage in the broom wagon and still start the next stage.

Technically, a new addition were gears. Lucien Petit-Breton, Maurice Brocco, Henri Cornet, Charles Pavese and Jean Alavoine rode with gears.

What had not changed was the points system. A cyclist received points, based on their rankings. As in 1909, the points system was "cleaned up" two times: after the 9th stage and after the 14th stage. Cyclists who had abandoned the race were removed from the rankings of the previous stages, and the classification was recalculated.

== Teams ==
Although cyclist were in 1909 able to register for the Tour with a sponsor, they were still considered to be riding as individuals; in 1910 they competed for the first time in teams.

The cyclists were not so enthusiastic about the inclusion of the Pyrenées, and there were fewer participants: 110 instead of 150 in 1909. There were three teams with 10 cyclists each, including all the favourites for the overall victory: Alcyon, Le Globe and Legnano. The French team "La Française" decided not to join, but allowed their cyclists to ride for the Italian Legnano team. The other 80 cyclists rode as individuals, this was called the "isolés" category.

== Race overview ==
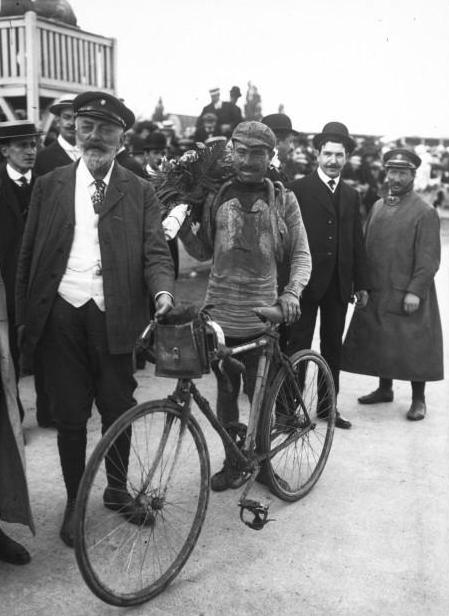
Octave Lapize after winning the Tour at the Parc des Princes in Paris

The first stage, from Paris to Roubaix, was won by Charles Crupelandt. In the second stage, François Faber showed his strengths, and won the stage, and took the lead.

On the rest day between the sixth and seventh stage in Nice, cyclist Adolphe Hélière died whilst swimming. He was the first victim of the Tour de France. In the ninth stage, four mountains were climbed, and Desgrange saw how much trouble the cyclists had on these mountains. The tenth stage would include the Pyrenees mountains, so Desgrange left the race and made Victor Breyer the director of the stage. In that tenth stage, the Tourmalet was climbed, the highest point of the 1910 Tour de France. Octave Lapize reached the top first, followed by Gustave Garrigou. Garrigou was the only cyclist who reached the top without dismounting, and received an extra prize of 100 francs for that. The next climb was the Aubisque. Lapize struggled there, and regional rider François Lafourcade lead the race. The organisers had a car standing in top, and when Lafourcade passed them, they did not recognize him, and when they found out it was Lafourcade, they were surprised that such an unknown rider had been able to pass all the 'cracks'. When Lapize passed the organiser's car (15 minutes later), he screamed "Assassins!", and announced that he would give up during the descent. Downhill, he refound his strength and was able to catch up to Lafourcade, and even win the stage. By the end of the stage, ten riders had officially completed the stage on bike.

After the 12th stage, Faber was leading the race by only one point. In that stage to Brest, Faber punctured, and Lapize took over the lead, helped by Garrigou.

In the 14th stage, Faber sped away almost from the start in what could be his last chance to win the Tour de France. It seemed that he had a chance, until a flat tyre caused him to lose time, and Lapize could get back to him, again aided by Garrigou. Lapize improved his lead by winning the stage, and had a six-point margin before the last stage. In that last stage, it was Lapize who suffered from a flat tyre, shortly after the start. Faber raced away, but could not pull off the stunt: he had a flat tyre. He still finished ahead of Lapize, but won back only two points, so the 1910 Tour de France was won by Lapize.

== Results ==
The Alcyon team was dominant in the 1910 Tour de France, winning 9 out of 15 stages.

=== Stage results ===
Stage characteristics and winners
Stage	Date	Course	Distance	Type (Note: In 1910, there was no distinction in the rules between plain stages and mountain stages; the icons shown here indicate which stages included mountains.)	Winner	Race leader
1	3 July	Paris to Roubaix	269 km (167 mi)	Plain stage	Charles Crupelandt (FRA)	Charles Crupelandt (FRA)
2	5 July	Roubaix to Metz	398 km (247 mi)	Plain stage	François Faber (LUX)	François Faber (LUX)
3	7 July	Metz to Belfort	259 km (161 mi)	Stage with mountain(s)	Emile Georget (FRA)	François Faber (LUX)
4	9 July	Belfort to Lyon	309 km (192 mi)	Stage with mountain(s)	François Faber (LUX)	François Faber (LUX)
5	11 July	Lyon to Grenoble	311 km (193 mi)	Stage with mountain(s)	Octave Lapize (FRA)	François Faber (LUX)
6	13 July	Grenoble to Nice	345 km (214 mi)	Stage with mountain(s)	Julien Maitron (FRA)	François Faber (LUX)
7	15 July	Nice to Nîmes	345 km (214 mi)	Plain stage	François Faber (LUX)	François Faber (LUX)
8	17 July	Nîmes to Perpignan	216 km (134 mi)	Plain stage	Georges Paulmier (FRA)	François Faber (LUX)
9	19 July	Perpignan to Luchon	289 km (180 mi)	Stage with mountain(s)	Octave Lapize (FRA)	François Faber (LUX)
10	21 July	Luchon to Bayonne	326 km (203 mi)	Stage with mountain(s)	Octave Lapize (FRA)	François Faber (LUX)
11	23 July	Bayonne to Bordeaux	269 km (167 mi)	Plain stage	Ernest Paul (FRA)	François Faber (LUX)
12	25 July	Bordeaux to Nantes	391 km (243 mi)	Plain stage	Louis Trousselier (FRA)	François Faber (LUX)
13	27 July	Nantes to Brest	321 km (199 mi)	Plain stage	Gustave Garrigou (FRA)	Octave Lapize (FRA)
14	29 July	Brest to Caen	424 km (263 mi)	Plain stage	Octave Lapize (FRA)	Octave Lapize (FRA)
15	31 July	Caen to Paris	262 km (163 mi)	Plain stage	Ernesto Azzini (ITA)	Octave Lapize (FRA)
	Total		4,734 km (2,942 mi)			

=== General classification ===
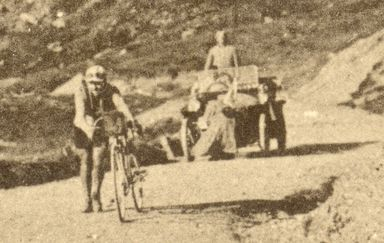
Octave Lapize, the winner of the 1910 Tour de France, climbing the Tourmalet on foot.

Of the 110 starting cyclists, 41 finished. The winner, Octave Lapize, received 5000 francs for his victory. In total, he earned 7525 francs during the race; the average daily wages were around 5 to 7 francs.

Final general classification (1–10)
Rank	Rider	Team	Points
1	Octave Lapize (FRA)	Alcyon	63
2	François Faber (LUX)	Alcyon	67
3	Gustave Garrigou (FRA)	Alcyon	86
4	Cyrille van Hauwaert (BEL)	Alcyon	97
5	Charles Cruchon (FRA)	–	119
6	Charles Crupelandt (FRA)	Le Globe	148
7	Ernest Paul (FRA)	–	154
8	André Blaise (BEL)	Alcyon	166
9	Julien Maitron (FRA)	Le Globe	171
10	Aldo Bettini (ITA)	Alcyon	175

Final general classification (11–41)
Rank	Rider	Sponsor	Points
11	Pierre Albini (ITA)	Legnano	176
12	Georges Paulmier (FRA)	Le Globe	182
13	Ernesto Azzini (ITA)	Legnano	194
14	François Lafourcade (FRA)	Legnano	205
15	Henri Cornet (FRA)	Le Globe	215
16	Jules Deloffre (FRA)	Le Globe	216
17	Constant Ménager (FRA)	Legnano	219
18	Luigi Azzini (ITA)	Legnano	220
19	Augustin Ringeval (FRA)	–	243
20	Frédéric Saillot (FRA)	Le Globe	257
21	Maurice Pardon (FRA)	–	316
22	Joseph Leblanc (FRA)	–	346
23	Georges Fleury (FRA)	–	357
24	Joseph Habierre (FRA)	–	381
25	François Riou (FRA)	–	398
26	Auguste Guyon (SUI)	–	402
27	Jean Bouillet (FRA)	–	406
28	Lucien Pothier (FRA)	–	410
29	Maurice Decaup (FRA)	Legnano	428
30	Lucien Leman (FRA)	–	433
31	Gabriel Mathonat (FRA)	–	443
32	Robert Chopard (SUI)	–	447
33	Pietro Ghislotti (ITA)	–	592
34	Lucien Rocquebert (FRA)	–	502
35	Georges Cauvry (FRA)	–	510
36	Camille Bière (FRA)	–	519
37	Auguste Dufour (FRA)	–	525
38	Louis Jouin (FRA)	–	532
39	René Chaudé (FRA)	–	549
40	Louis Picard (FRA)	–	568
41	Constant Collet (FRA)	–	580

=== Other classifications ===
Fifth-placed Charles Cruchon became the winner of the "isolés" category. The organising newspaper l'Auto named Octave Lapize the meilleur grimpeur. This unofficial title is the precursor to the mountains classification.

== Aftermath ==
One week after the finish of the 1910 Tour, the Tour de France des Indépendants started. It ran from 7 August to 14 September, over 14 stages, and was organized by Peugeot and Wolber. It was not related to the main Tour de France, but participants from this race for independent riders have been confused for participants of the 1910 Tour de France.

== Bibliography ==
- Amels, Wim (1984). De geschiedenis van de Tour de France 1903–1984 (in Dutch). Valkenswaard, Netherlands: Sport-Express. ISBN 978-90-70763-05-3.
- Augendre, Jacques (2016). "Guide historique" [Historical guide] (PDF). Tour de France (in French). Paris: Amaury Sport Organisation. Archived (PDF) from the original on 17 August 2016.
- Cleijne, Jan (2014). Legends of the Tour. London: Head of Zeus. ISBN 978-1-78185-998-8.
- Cossins, Peter; Best, Isabel; Sidwells, Chris; Griffith, Clare (2013). Le Tour 100: The Definitive History of the World's Greatest Race. London: Hachette UK. ISBN 978-1-84403-759-9.
- McGann, Bill; McGann, Carol (2006). The Story of the Tour de France: 1903–1964. Vol. 1. Indianapolis, IN: Dog Ear Publishing. ISBN 978-1-59858-180-5.
- Mulholland, Owen (2003). Cycling's Great Climbers. Boulder, CO: VeloPress. ISBN 978-1-931382-12-0.
- Thompson, Christopher S. (2006). The Tour de France: A Cultural History. Oakland, CA: University of California Press. ISBN 978-0-520-24760-4.
