= René Vandenberghe =

Personal information
- Born: 5 March 1887 Pittem, Belgium
- Died: 3 July 1958 (aged 71) Roeselare, Belgium

Cycling career
- Sport: Cycling
- Discipline: Road
- Role: Rider

Professional teams
- 1909: La Française
- 1910: Individual
- 1911: Alcyon–Dunlop
- 1912–1913: Thomann
- 1913: Alcyon–Soly
- 1914: JB Louvet–Continental
- 1914: Liberator
- 1921: Individual

René Vandenberghe (5 March 1887 – 3 July 1958) was a Belgian road cyclist. Professional from 1909 to 1921, he won the Tour of Belgium in 1911. He also rode in the Tour de France four times, with his best result being 12th in 1912. That year, he also finished 2nd in two stages and 3rd in two stages of the race.

== Major results ==
1908
4th Liège–Bastogne–Liège
1909
1st Stage 1 Tour of Belgium
4th Kampioenschap van Vlaanderen
1910
1st Stage 1 Tour of Belgium
6th Paris–Roubaix
1911
1st Overall Tour of Belgium

1st Stages 2, 3, 5, 6 & 7

5th Paris–Roubaix
9th Paris–Tours
1912
1st Six Days of Brussels (with Octave Lapize)
1913
3rd Bordeaux–Paris
4th Paris–Tours
6th Overall Tour of Belgium

1st Stage 5

1914
10th Paris–Tours
1915
2nd Six Days of Brussels
