= 1910 Giro di Lombardia =

Race details
- Dates: 6 November 1910
- Stages: 1
- Distance: 232 km (144.2 mi)
- Winning time: 8h 35' 32"

Results
	Winner	Giovanni Micheletto (ITA)
	Second	Luigi Ganna (ITA)
	Third	Luigi Bailo (ITA)

The 1910 Giro di Lombardia was the sixth edition of the Giro di Lombardia cycle race and was held on 6 November 1910. The race started in Milan and finished in Sesto San Giovanni. The race was won by Giovanni Micheletto.

== General classification ==
Final general classification

Rank	Rider	Team	Time
1	Giovanni Micheletto (ITA)	Stucchi	8h 35' 32"
2	Luigi Ganna (ITA)	Atala-Continental	+ 0"
3	Luigi Bailo (ITA)		+ 4' 00"
4	Domenico Cittera (ITA)	Legnano	+ 6' 00"
5	Carlo Galetti (ITA)	Atala-Continental	+ 11' 00"
6	Guido Matteoni (ITA)		+ 11' 00"
7	Emilio Chironi (ITA)	Otav-Pirelli	+ 21' 00"
8	Luigi Azzini (ITA)	Legnano	+ 21' 00"
9	Battista Danesi (ITA)	Atala-Continental	+ 25' 00"
10	Giuseppe Dilda (ITA)		+ 30' 00"
