= Frédéric Saillot =

French cyclist

Personal information
- Born: 1884 Le Perreux-sur-Marne, France

Cycling career
- Sport: Cycling
- Discipline: Road
- Role: Rider

Professional teams
- 1906: Terrot
- 1909: Biguet–Dunlop
- 1910: Le Globe–Dunlop
- 1911: Le Globe–Dunlop

Frédéric Saillot (born 1884) was a French road racing cyclist. He achieved the podium of the Paris–Tours. He rode four times the Tour de France and finished 20th overall.

== Career ==
Saillot was active during the 2nd half of the 1900s and first half of the 1910s. He was professional in 1906 and from 1909 to 1911 for Terrot, Biguet–Dunlop and Le Globe. His best achievement was in the 1908 Paris–Tours, one of the international classic cycle races. In this race he was ahead with Omer Beaugendre, but lost the sprint from him at the finish. He participant in a total of four Tour de France editions between 1906 and 1911. His best result was a ninth place overall at the 1910 Tour de France and he had a total of two top-10 achievement in stages in 1909 and 1910.

== Palmarès ==
1908
2nd 1908 Paris–Tours

1909
8th stage 10 1909 Tour de France

1910
8th stage 4 1910 Tour de France

=== Grand Tour general classification and classic cycling races results ===
Grand Tour general classification results
Race	1906	1909	1910	1911
Tour de France	DNF	DNF	20th	DNF

Major Classic results
Monument	1908	1909	1910	1911
Paris–Tours	2nd	—	—	25th
Paris–Roubaix	—	19th	39th	—
Classic	1908	1909	1910	1911
Paris–Brussels	—	20th	—	—
Bordeaux–Paris	—	—	—	7th
