= 1913 Paris–Tours =

Race details
- Dates: 6 April 1913
- Stages: 1
- Distance: 246 km (153 mi)
- Winning time: 7h 15' 00"

Results
	Winner	Charles Crupelandt (BEL)
	Second	Georges Passerieu (BEL)
	Third	Louis Luguet (FRA)

The 1913 Paris–Tours was the tenth edition of the Paris–Tours cycle race and was held on 6 April 1913. The race started in Paris and finished in Tours. The race was won by Charles Crupelandt.

== General classification ==
Final general classification

Rank	Rider	Time
1	Charles Crupelandt (BEL)	7h 15' 00"
2	Georges Passerieu (BEL)	+ 0"
3	Louis Luguet (FRA)	+ 0"
4	René Vandenberghe (BEL)	+ 0"
5	Louis Mottiat (BEL)	+ 0"
6	Jean Rossius (BEL)	+ 0"
7	Georges Tribouillard (FRA)	+ 0"
8	Émile Engel (FRA)	+ 0"
9	Émile Georget (FRA)	+ 0"
10	Emile Aerts (BEL)	+ 0"
