= Henri Hanlet =

Belgian cyclist

- Hanlet in 1909

Personal information
- Full name: Henri Hanlet
- Born: 11 September 1888 Liège, Belgium
- Died: 2 September 1964 (aged 75) Olne, Belgium

Cycling career
- Sport: Cycling
- Role: Rider

Henri Hanlet (11 September 1888 – 2 September 1964) was a Belgian racing cyclist. He won the Belgian national road race title in 1910. The previous year he finished in 8th place in 1909 Paris–Roubaix.
