= Augusto Rho =

Italian cyclist

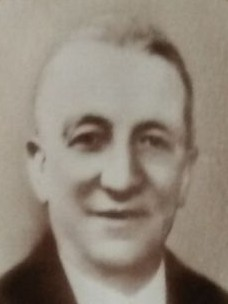

Personal information
- Born: 1 August 1888 Milan, Kingdom of Italy
- Died: 9 November 1963 (aged 75)

Cycling career
- Sport: Cycling
- Discipline: Road
- Role: Rider

Augusto Rho (1 August 1888 – 9 November 1963) was an Italian racing cyclist. He rode in the 1909 Tour de France, the inaugural 1909 Giro d'Italia and several others since, including the 1924 Tour de France. He was 11th in the 1910 Giro d'Italia general classification.

== Biography ==
Albert Londres, covering the 1924 Tour de France for Le Parisien, wrote that Rho resembled Gabriele D'Annunzio and sang even when he was last.

== Personal life ==
He was married with Adele Moretti and had one daughter Cristina. Augusto Rho is buried in the Cimitero Maggiore di Milano (2nd central ossuary) near his family.
