= 1909 Giro di Lombardia =

Race details
- Dates: 7 November 1909
- Stages: 1
- Distance: 193 km (119.9 mi)
- Winning time: 6h 13' 21"

Results
	Winner	Giovanni Cuniolo (ITA)
	Second	Omer Beaugendre (FRA)
	Third	Louis Trousselier (FRA)

The 1909 Giro di Lombardia was the fifth edition of the Giro di Lombardia cycle race and was held on 7 November 1909. The race started in Milan and finished in Sesto San Giovanni. The race was won by Giovanni Cuniolo.

== General classification ==
Final general classification

Rank	Rider	Time
1	Giovanni Cuniolo (ITA)	6h 13' 21"
2	Omer Beaugendre (FRA)	+ 0"
3	Louis Trousselier (FRA)	+ 0"
4	Octave Lapize (FRA)	+ 0"
5	Alfredo Tibiletti (ITA)	+ 0"
=6	Ugo Agostoni (ITA)	+ 0"
=6	Ernesto Azzini (ITA)	+ 0"
=6	Luigi Azzini (ITA)	+ 0"
=6	Gino Brizzi (ITA)	+ 0"
=6	Eugène Christophe (FRA)	+ 0"
