= 1914 Paris–Roubaix =

Cycling race

Race details
- Dates: 12 April 1914
- Stages: 1
- Distance: 274 km (170.3 mi)
- Winning time: 9h 02' 00"

Results
| | Winner | Charles Crupelandt (FRA) |
| | Second | Louis Luguet (FRA) |
| | Third | Louis Mottiat (BEL) |

The 1914 Paris–Roubaix was the 19th edition of the Paris–Roubaix, a classic one-day cycle race in France. The single day event was held on 12 April 1914 and stretched 274 km (170 mi) from Paris to its end in a velodrome in Roubaix. The winner was Charles Crupelandt from France.

== Results ==
Final results (1–10)
| Rank | Cyclist | Time |
|---|---|---|
| 1 | Charles Crupelandt (FRA) | 9h 02' 00″ |
| 2 | Louis Luguet (FRA) | +0' 00″ |
| 3 | Louis Mottiat (BEL) | +0' 00″ |
| 4 | Oscar Egg (SUI) | +0' 00″ |
| 5 | Jean Rossius (BEL) | +0' 00″ |
| 6 | Cyrille Van Houwaert (BEL) | +0' 00″ |
| 7 | Pierre Van de Velde (BEL) | +0' 00″ |
| 8 | Dieudonné Gauthy (BEL) | +0' 00″ |
| 9 | Emile Aerts (BEL) | +0' 00″ |
| 10 | Emile Georget (FRA) | +0' 00″ |
