= Constant Collet =

French cyclist

Personal information
- Full name: Constant Collet
- Born: 28 January 1889 Talensac, France
- Died: 3 March 1937 (aged 48) Rennes, France

Cycling career
- Sport: Cycling
- Role: Rider

Constant Collet (28 January 1889 – 3 March 1937) was a French racing cyclist. He finished in last place in the 1910 Tour de France.
