= Maurice Pardon =

French cyclist (1884–1944)

Personal information
- Born: 28 December 1884 Vitry-sur-Seine, France
- Died: 16 October 1944 (aged 59) Septmonts, France
- Height: 1.51 m (4 ft 11 in)
- Weight: 54 kg (119 lb)

Cycling career
- Sport: Cycling
- Discipline: Road
- Role: Rider

Professional teams
- 1908: Alcyon–Dunlop
- 1909: Femina Cycles
- 1910–1911: Le Globe–Dunlop

Maurice Pardon (28 December 1884 – 16 October 1944) was a French road cyclist who was active professionally from 1908 to 1911.

== Biography ==
Pardon was born in Vitry-sur-Seine on 28 December 1884. He turned professional in 1908, riding for the Alcyon–Dunlop team and later for Femina Cycles and Le Globe–Dunlop. In 1900 he placed ninth in the French National Road Race Championships and second in Paris-Calais behind Constant Ménager. In the 1910 Tour de France, Pardon competed among the isolés (independent riders). These riders received no mechanical, food, or lodging assistance and were responsible for their own needs. After a stage, reportedly famished, he took food intended for riders in the "grouped" category. Race director Henri Desgrange disqualified him from all prize money and awards. Despite being penniless and hungry, Pardon completed the race in 21st place overall.

== Major results ==
1909
2nd Paris-Calais
9th National Road Race Championships
19th Paris–Brussels
1911
15th Paris–Tours

=== Grand Tour general classification results ===
Stage races	1908	1909	1910	1911
Tour de France	DNF	DNF	21st	23rd
