= 1911 Paris–Roubaix =

Cycling race

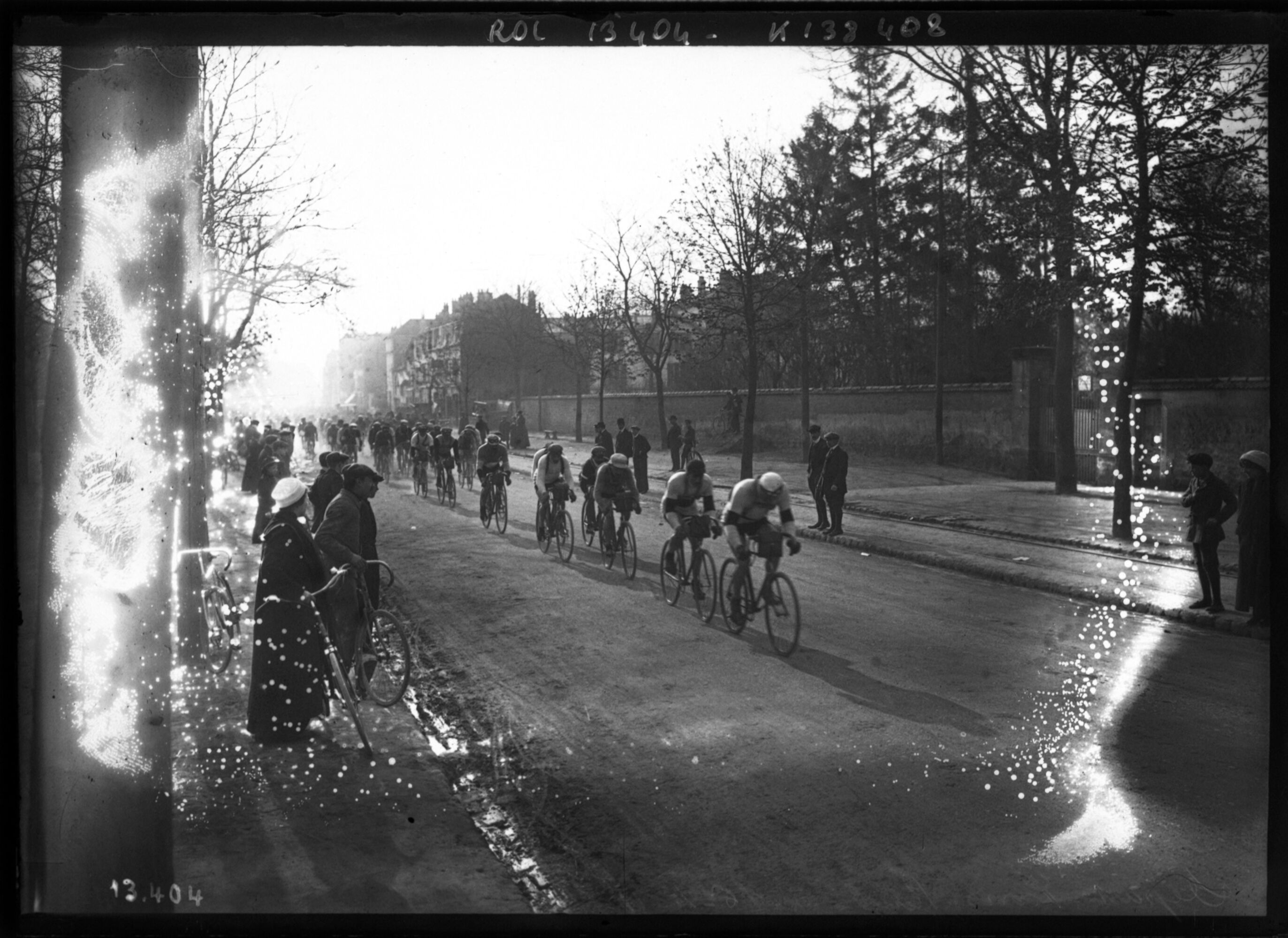
- Start of the 1911 Paris–Roubaix

Race details
- Dates: 16 April 1911
- Stages: 1
- Distance: 266 km (165.3 mi)
- Winning time: 8h 29' 10"

Results
	Winner	Octave Lapize (FRA)
	Second	Alphonse Charpiot (FRA)
	Third	Cyrille Van Houwaert (BEL)

The 1911 Paris–Roubaix was the 16th edition of the Paris–Roubaix, a classic one-day cycle race in France. The single day event was held on 16 April 1911 and stretched 266 km (165 mi) from Paris to its end in a velodrome in Roubaix. The winner was Octave Lapize from France.

== Results ==
Final results (1–10)
Rank	Cyclist	Time
1	Octave Lapize (FRA)	8h 29' 10″
2	Alphonse Charpiot (FRA)	+0' 00″
3	Cyrille Van Houwaert (BEL)	+4' 50″
4	Gustave Garrigou (FRA)	+7' 50″
5	René Vandenberghe (BEL)	+9' 50″
6	Georges Passerieu (FRA)	+11' 50″
7	Georges Tribouillard (FRA)	+12' 50″
8	Constant Niedergang (FRA)	+12' 50″
9	Maurice Leturgie (FRA)	+13' 50″
10	Eugène Dhers (FRA)	+14' 50″
