= Charles Pavese =

French cyclist

Personal information
- Born: 30 October 1890
- Died: 14 March 1967 (aged 76)

Cycling career
- Sport: Cycling
- Role: Rider

Charles Pavese (30 October 1890 – 14 March 1967) was a French racing cyclist. He rode in the 1910 Tour de France, 1911 Tour de France and 1920 Tour de France.
