= Joseph Habierre =

Spanish cyclist (1888–1954)

Personal information
- Full name: José María Javierre Rapún
- Born: 4 February 1888 Jaca, Province of Huesca, Spain
- Died: 22 April 1954 (aged 66) Oloron-Sainte-Marie, France
- Height: 172 cm (5 ft 8 in)
- Weight: 61 kg (134 lb)

Cycling career
- Sport: Cycling
- Discipline: Road
- Role: Rider

Major wins
- Monein–Artix (1908); Pau–Puyoô–Pau (1908)

José María Javierre Rapún, commonly known as Joseph Habierre (4 February 1888 – 22 April 1954) was a Spanish road racing cyclist who later became a naturalized French citizen.

He is regarded as the first Spanish cyclist to compete in the Tour de France, having ridden the 1909 Tour de France and 1910 Tour de France editions. Until research published in 2003, Vicente Blanco had generally been regarded as the first Spanish participant.

== Personal life ==
Javierre was born in Plaza de la Estrella (now Plaza de Ripa) in Jaca, in the Province of Huesca, Spain, on 4 February 1888. He was baptised two days later at the Jaca Cathedral. He was the son of Justo Javierre, a day labourer from Javierregay, and Oriosa Rapún, a native of Borau. He had five siblings. After the death of his father when he was four years old, his mother moved by foot with her children to France, where the family settled in Lescar. There, the family surname "Javierre" became Frenchified as "Habierre". He also adopted the French form of his given name, Joseph. He received the French nationality on 25 January 1915.

Habierre had two children, Cécile and Auguste. Cécile Habierre married French boxer and rugby player Bernard Yus. Auguste Habierre was a French skier and founder of the Royal Asport bicycle brand.

He died in his home in Oloron-Sainte-Marie on 22 April 1954. In 2004, his daughter Cécile was still living there.

== Cycling career ==
As a teenager, he worked in a factory while developing an interest in cycling. At the age of 17, he built his own bicycle and began competing in local races.

Habierre won several regional races, including victories at the Pau and Bois Louis velodromes with the Véloce-Club Palois. In 1908 he won the Monein–Artix race and the 100-kilometre Pau–Puyoô–Pau event.

In 1909, he entered the Tour de France as an independent rider. He finished 17th overall and sixth among the independent competitors. The following year, after moving to Oloron-Sainte-Marie, he opened a bicycle shop selling Alcyon bicycles and again rode the 1910 Tour de France, finishing 24th overall.

Although he was still a Spanish national, he entered the Tour de France as a French rider. Because he competed under a French identity, historians long believed that Vicente Blanco was the first Spanish rider to compete in the Tour de France in 1910. Research published by the Belgian cycling magazine Coup de Pédales in 2003 established that Habierre had preceded Blanco by one year.

Tour de France director Henri Desgrange invited him to return for the following edition, but he did not compete again.

After his cycling career, Habierre worked as a bicycle mechanic, builder and retailer in Oloron-Sainte-Marie. His children founded the Royal Asport bicycle brand there in the 1950s, that also served as the namesake of the Kas–Royal Asport cycling team. In 2021, local entrepreneur Marc Duchesne announced plans to revive the marque.

== Military service ==
Seeking French citizenship, Habierre enlisted in the French Foreign Legion. During the World War I he served for four years becoming a naturalised French citizen in January 1915.

He was wounded several times, including at the Battle of Verdun, leaving him permanently disabled. For his military service he received the Legion of Honour and the Croix de Guerre.

== Major results ==
1908

- 1st Monein–Artix
- 1st Pau–Puyoô–Pau

1909

- 17th Overall 1909 Tour de France

1910

- 24th Overall 1910 Tour de France
