= Édouard Léonard =

French cyclist

Personal information
- Born: 18 October 1882 Paris, France
- Died: 23 March 1968 (aged 85) Neuilly-sur-Seine, France

Cycling career
- Sport: Cycling
- Role: Rider

Édouard Léonard (18 October 1882 – 23 March 1968) was a French racing cyclist.

== Biography ==
He finished fourth twice in Paris–Roubaix, at the 1908 Paris–Roubaix and 1910 Paris–Roubaix, and third in the French National Road Race Championships in 1909. He served in the infantry during the First World War. He rode after WWI in the 1920 Tour de France.

== Honours ==
- Croix de guerre 1914–1918 (France) (bronze)

== Achievements ==
- 1900
  - 3rd French Stayers Championship
- 1907
  - 2nd Paris–Honfleur
- 1908
  - 4th Paris–Roubaix
- 1909
  - 3rd French National Road Race Championship
  - 9th Paris–Roubaix
- 1910
  - 4th Paris–Roubaix
  - 4th Paris–Tours
  - 4th French National Road Race Championship
- 1919
  - 3rd Bol d'Or
- 1920
  - 2nd Critérium de la Résistance
