= Robert Chopard =

Swiss cyclist (1886–1951)

Personal information
- Born: 2 September 1886 Le Locle, Switzerland
- Died: 11 January 1951 (aged 64) Péry, Switzerland

Cycling career
- Sport: Cycling
- Discipline: Road
- Role: Rider

Professional teams
- 1909: Individual
- 1910: Cosmos
- 1911–1918: Individual

Robert Chopard (2 September 1886 – 11 January 1951) was a Swiss professional road cyclist active from 1909 to 1918. He was the Swiss national road race champion for the German-speaking reagion in 1911. He also competed in the 1910 Tour de France.

== Biography ==
Chopard was born in Le Locle on 2 September 1886. His brothers Émile and Paul Chopard were also cyclists. In 1908 and 1909, he placed second in the Swiss National Road Race Championships as an amateur. Turning professional in 1909, he again finished runner-up in the 1910 national championship before claiming the title in 1911. Other notable results included second at Munchen-Zurich in 1912; third at the Rund um die Hainleite in 1913 and third in the Zürich Championship in 1914.

He also competed at other main international cycling races including the 1910 Tour de France. He was awarded a Perpignan Garnet jewel.

== Major results ==
1908
2nd National Road Race Championships (amateurs)
1909
2nd National Road Race Championships (amateurs)
1910
2nd National Road Race Championships
1911
1st National Road Race Championships
1912
10th Großer Sachsenpreis
2nd München-Zurich
1913
3rd Rund um die Hainleite
1914
3rd Zürich Championship

=== Grand Tour general classification results ===
Stage races	1910
Tour de France	32nd
