= Adolphe Hélière =

French cyclist

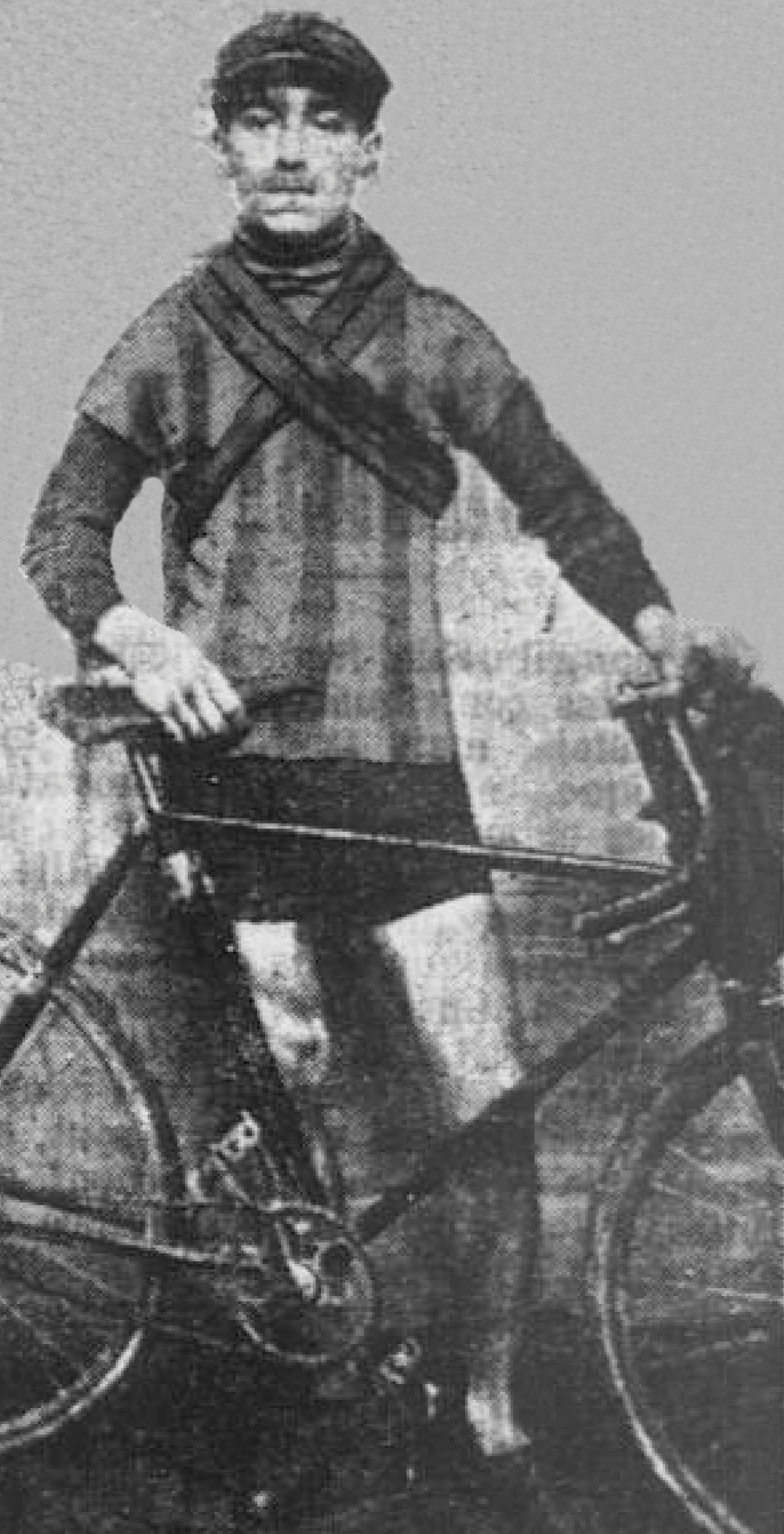

Personal information
- Full name: Adolphe Hélière
- Born: 10 March 1891 France
- Died: 14 July 1910 (aged 19) Nice, France

Cycling career
- Sport: Cycling
- Discipline: Road
- Role: Rider

Adolphe Hélière (10 March 1891 – 14 July 1910) was a French cyclist who died during the 1910 Tour de France.

He died on a rest day after the sixth stage from Grenoble to Nice. He was reportedly stung by a jellyfish while bathing in the ocean near Nice, although his cause of death is unclear and may have been drowning due to exhaustion.

While three men have died during the actual race, Hélière is often listed in the four total deaths. He was 19 years old when he died.
