= 1912 Paris–Roubaix =

Cycling race

Race details
- Dates: 7 April 1912
- Stages: 1
- Distance: 266 km (165.3 mi)
- Winning time: 8h 30' 00"

Results
	Winner	Charles Crupelandt (FRA)
	Second	Gustave Garrigou (FRA)
	Third	Maurice Léturgie (FRA)

The 1912 Paris–Roubaix was the 17th edition of the Paris–Roubaix, a classic one-day cycle race in France. The single day event was held on 7 April 1912 and stretched 266 km (165 mi) from Paris to its end in a velodrome in Roubaix. The winner was Charles Crupelandt from France.

== Results ==
Final results (1–10)
Rank	Cyclist	Time
1	Charles Crupelandt (FRA)	8h 30' 00″
2	Gustave Garrigou (FRA)	+0' 00″
3	Maurice Léturgie (FRA)	+0' 00″
4	Octave Lapize (FRA)	+0' 00″
5	Odiel Defraye (BEL)	+0' 00″
6	Jules Masselis (BEL)	+0' 00″
7	Charles Deruyter (BEL)	+0' 00″
8	Joseph Van Daele (BEL)	+6' 00″
9	Eugène Platteau (BEL)	+6' 00″
10	Paul Deman (BEL)	+6' 00″
