= 1913 Paris–Roubaix =

Cycling race

Race details
- Dates: 23 March 1913
- Stages: 1
- Distance: 266 km (165 mi)
- Winning time: 7h 30' 00"

Results
	Winner	François Faber (LUX)
	Second	Charles Deruyter (BEL)
	Third	Charles Crupelandt (FRA)

The 1913 Paris–Roubaix was the 18th edition of the Paris–Roubaix, a classic one-day cycle race in France. The single-day event was held on 23 March 1913 and extended 266 km (165 mi) from Paris to its end in a velodrome in Roubaix. The winner was François Faber from Luxembourg.

== Results ==
Final results (1–10)
Rank	Cyclist	Time
1	François Faber (LUX)	7h 30' 00″
2	Charles Deruyter (BEL)	+0' 00″
3	Charles Crupelandt (FRA)	+0' 00″
4	Louis Mottiat (BEL)	+0' 00″
5	Louis Luguet (FRA)	+0' 00″
6	Joseph Van Daele (BEL)	+0' 00″
7	Jules Masselis (BEL)	+0' 00″
8	Georges Passerieu (BEL)	+1' 30″
9	Auguste Benoît (BEL)	+3' 30″
10	André Blaise (BEL)	+7' 00″
