= 1911 Milan–San Remo =

Race details
- Dates: 2 April 1911
- Stages: 1
- Distance: 289.3 km (179.8 mi)
- Winning time: 9h 37' 00"

Results
	Winner	Gustave Garrigou (FRA)
	Second	Louis Trousselier (FRA)
	Third	Luigi Ganna (ITA)

The 1911 Milan–San Remo was the fifth edition of the Milan–San Remo cycle race and was held on 2 April 1911. The race started in Milan and finished in San Remo. The race was won by Gustave Garrigou.

== General classification ==
Final general classification

Rank	Rider	Time
1	Gustave Garrigou (FRA)	9h 37' 00"
2	Louis Trousselier (FRA)	+ 6' 00"
3	Luigi Ganna (ITA)	+ 16' 00"
4	Carlo Galetti (ITA)	+ 20' 00"
5	Henri Lignon (FRA)	+ 20' 00"
6	Eugène Christophe (FRA)	+ 21' 00"
7	Dario Beni (ITA)	+ 23' 00"
8	Marcel Godivier (FRA)	+ 23' 00"
9	Alfredo Sivocci (ITA)	+ 23' 00"
10	Luigi Azzini (ITA)	+ 24' 00"
11	André Blaise (BEL)	+ 24' 30"
12	Francois Faber (LUX)	+ 27' 30"
