= Henri Ory =

French cyclist

Personal information
- Born: 28 April 1884
- Died: 4 August 1963 (aged 79)

Cycling career
- Sport: Cycling
- Role: Rider

Henri Ory (28 April 1884 – 4 August 1963) was a French racing cyclist. He rode in the 1920 Tour de France.
