= Camille Bière =

French cyclist

Personal information
- Born: 13 September 1889
- Died: 31 July 1969 (aged 79)

Cycling career
- Sport: Cycling
- Discipline: Road
- Role: Rider

Camille Bière (13 September 1889 – 31 July 1969) was a French racing cyclist. He rode in the 1926 Tour de France.
