= Cyrille van Hauwaert =

Belgian cyclist

Cyrille Van Hauwaert
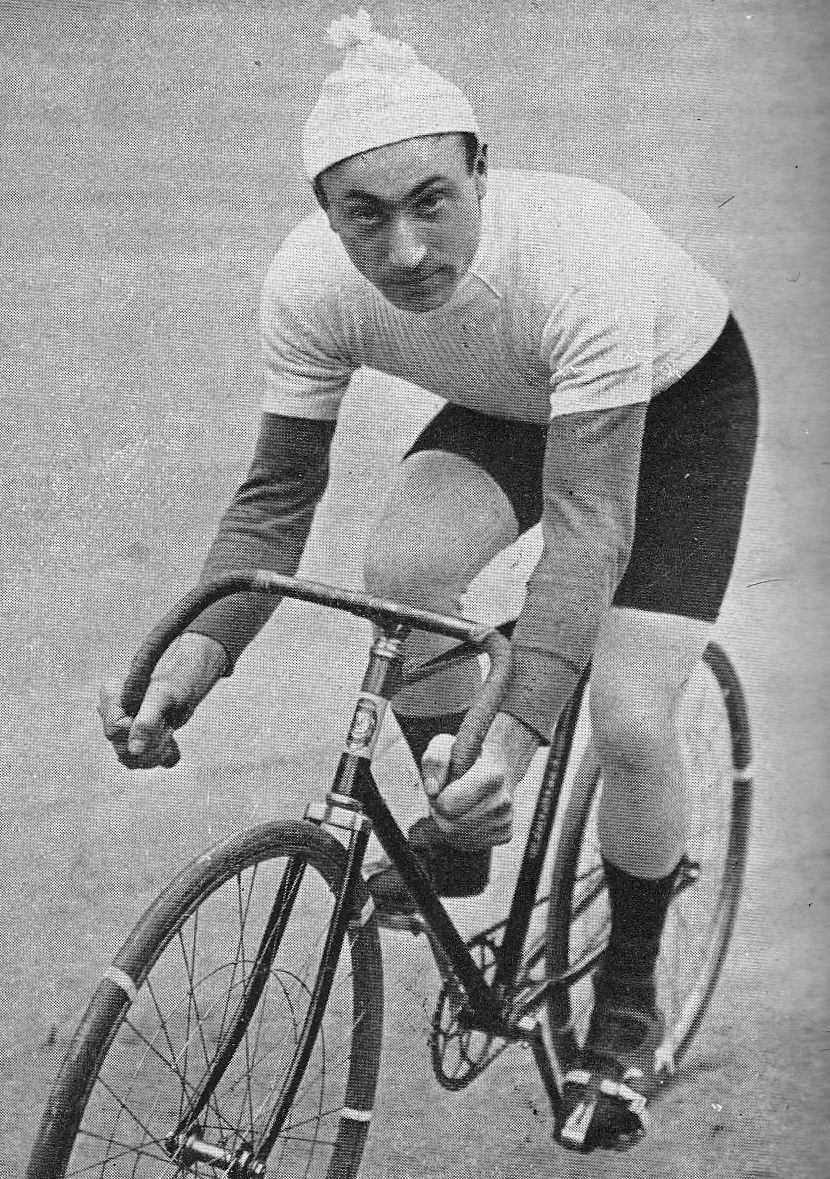
- Van Hauwaert in 1907

Personal information
- Full name: Cyrille Van Hauwaert
- Nickname: Ventre ouvert (Open belly)
- Born: 16 December 1883 Moorslede, Belgium
- Died: 15 February 1974 (aged 90) Zellik, Belgium

Cycling career
- Sport: Cycling
- Discipline: Road
- Role: Rider

Professional teams
- 1907: Alcyon-Dunlop & La Française-Persan
- 1908-10: Alcyon-Dunlop
- 1911-13: La Française-Diamant
- 1914: La Française-Hutchinson
- 1915: Individual

Major wins
- Grand Tours Tour de France 1 individual stage (1909) One-day races and Classics National Road Race Championships (1909) Bordeaux–Paris (1907, 1909) Milan–San Remo (1908) Paris–Roubaix (1908)

Cyrille Van Hauwaert (16 December 1883 – 15 February 1974) was a Belgian professional road bicycle racer, known for winning classics as Bordeaux–Paris (1907 and 1909), Milan–San Remo and Paris–Roubaix (both 1908). He was the first Belgian cyclist to win a stage in the Tour de France in 1909, also leading the general classification for one day.

In 1908, prior to winning Milan–San Remo, Van Hauwaert had traveled by bike from Belgium to the start in Milan, by means of training.

== Major results ==
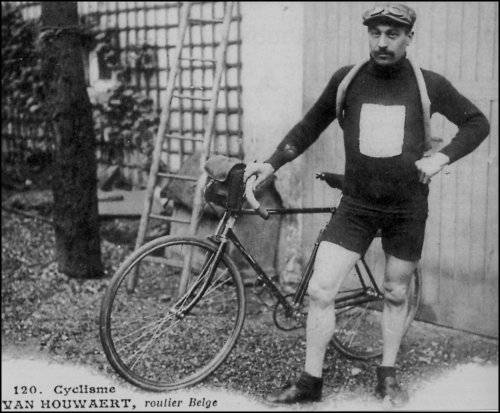
Cyrille van Hauwaert in 1908

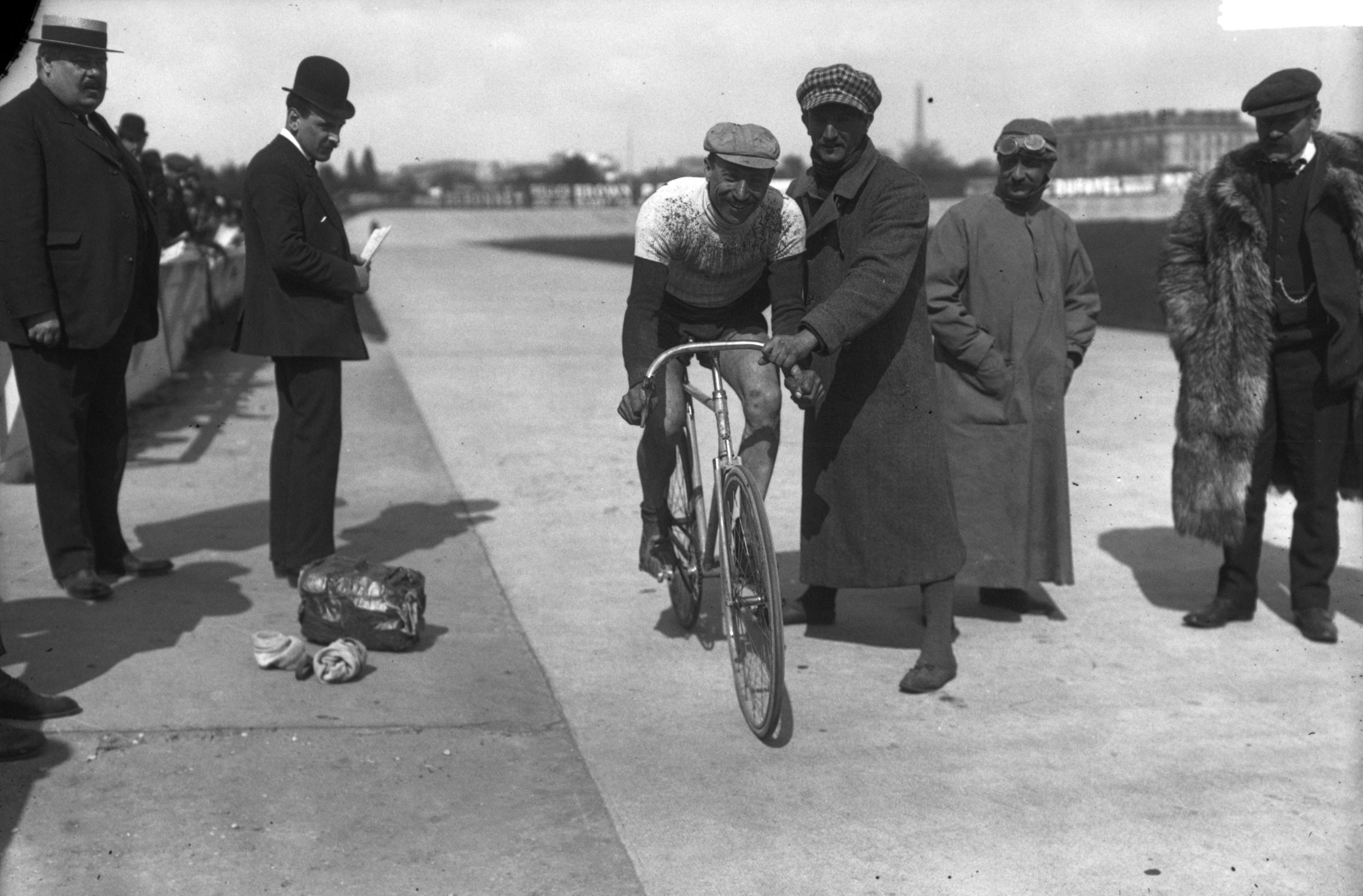
Van Hauwaert arriving in the Parc des Princes at the 1909 Bordeaux-Paris

1907
1st Bordeaux–Paris
2nd Paris–Roubaix
4th Paris–Brussels
1908
1st Milan–San Remo
1st Paris–Roubaix
2nd Bordeaux–Paris
2nd Paris–Brussels
2nd Road race, National Road Championships
1909
1st Road race, National Road Championships
1st Bordeaux–Paris
3rd Overall Tour of Belgium

1st Stages 2 & 4

4th Paris–Roubaix
4th Milan–San Remo
5th Overall Tour de France

1st Stage 1

6th Giro di Lombardia
1910
1st Paris–Menin
2nd Paris–Roubaix
3rd Paris–Brussels
4th Overall Tour de France
1911
2nd Paris–Tours
3rd Milan–San Remo
3rd Paris–Roubaix
3rd Giro di Lombardia
3rd Road race, National Road Championships
5th Paris–Brest–Paris
1912
2nd Six Days of Brussels (with Arthur Vanderstuyft)
10th Paris–Brussels
1913
2nd Paris–Brussels
2nd Bordeaux–Paris
1914
1st Six Days of Brussels (with John Stol)
3rd Bordeaux–Paris
6th Paris–Roubaix
1915
1st Six Days of Brussels (with Joseph Van Bever)
