= Vicente Blanco =

Spanish cyclist (1884–1957)

Personal information
- Born: 15 March 1884 Deusto, Spain
- Died: 24 May 1957 (aged 73) Bilbao, Spain

Cycling career
- Sport: Cycling
- Discipline: Road
- Role: Rider

Professional teams
- 1906: S.C Bilbaina
- 1908-1909: Vizcaina
- 1909: Alcyon-Le Gaulois
- 1910: Casanovas
- 1911-1912: Alcyon-Dunlop
- 1912: Athletico Club Bilbao

Vicente Blanco (born 15 March 1884 in Deusto – 24 May 1957 in Bilbao) was a Spanish racing cyclist. He won the Spanish National Road Race Championships in 1908 and 1909.

== Palmarès ==
1908
National Road Race Champion
1909
National Road Race Champion
1910
National Stayer Champion
1st Donostia-Tolosa-Donostia
1st Somorrostro
1st Ortuella
1911
3rd Volta a Catalunya
1st Bilbao Bilbao-Erletxeta
1st Somorrostro
Champion Vasconavarro (Copa Comet)
1st Areatza
Champion Basconavarrès (Copa Comet)
1st Carrera Alcyon
1st Vitoria
1912
1st Las Arenas-Plentzia-Las Arenas
1st Eibar
1st Deusto
1st Mondragon-Arrasate (San Juan)
