= 1909 Paris–Roubaix =

Cycling race

Race details
- Dates: 11 April 1909
- Stages: 1
- Distance: 276 km (171 mi)
- Winning time: 9h 3' 30"

Results
| | Winner | Octave Lapize (FRA) |
| | Second | Louis Trousselier (FRA) |
| | Third | Jules Masselis (BEL) |

The 1909 Paris–Roubaix was the 14th edition of the Paris–Roubaix, a classic one-day cycle race in France. The single day event was held on 11 April 1909 and stretched 276 km (171 mi) from Paris to its end in a velodrome in Roubaix. The winner was Octave Lapize from France.

== Results ==
Final results (1–10)
| Rank | Cyclist | Time |
|---|---|---|
| 1 | Octave Lapize (FRA) | 9h 3' 30″ |
| 2 | Louis Trousselier (FRA) | +0' 00″ |
| 3 | Jules Masselis (BEL) | +0' 00″ |
| 4 | Cyrille Van Houwaert (BEL) | +0' 30″ |
| 5 | François Faber (LUX) | +1' 20″ |
| 6 | Marcel Godivier (FRA) | +15' 30″ |
| 7 | Gustave Garrigou (FRA) | +16' 45″ |
| 8 | Henri Hanlet (BEL) | +16' 46″ |
| 9 | Édouard Léonard (FRA) | +20' 30″ |
| 10 | Paul Duboc (FRA) | +22' 30″ |
