= Luigi Azzini =

Italian cyclist (1884–1937)

Personal information
- Full name: Luigi Azzini
- Born: 1 February 1884 Rodigo, Italy
- Died: 9 July 1937 (aged 53) Milan, Italy

Cycling career
- Sport: Cycling
- Discipline: Road
- Role: Rider

Professional teams
- 1909: Labor–Chauvia
- 1910: Legnano
- 1910: Atena
- 1911–1912: Legnano
- 1913: Globo–Dunlop

Major wins
- Coppa del Re (1908)

Luigi Azzini (1 February 1884 – 9 July 1937) was an Italian professional road racing cyclist who competed during the 1900s and 1910s. He won the Coppa del Re in 1908 and competed in the Giro d'Italia and Tour de France during the early years of both stage races.

== Biography ==
Born in Rodigo, Italy, in 1884. He was the oldest of three brothers. His brothers Ernesto Azzini (born 1885) and Giuseppe Azzini (born 1891) also became cyclists.

By profession, he was a printer. During his printing education, he studied together with his brother Ernesto and cyclist Carlo Galletti. They became friends with Galletti and would also borrow their bicycle, as his family could not afford one themselves.

Azzini competed in early Italian road races. As an amateur he won in 1908 the Coppa del Re and Coppa Rho. He was a professional cyclist from 1909 to 1913.

As a professional cyclist he had some victories and several decent placings in major races, like a fourth place in Milano–Modena, sixth in 1909 Giro di Lombardia and seventeenth in 1909 Milan–San Remo. He participated in the Grand Tours. He finished the 1910 Tour de France overall in 17th place and competed in the Giro d'Italia four times, including in the inaugural 1909 Giro d'Italia. There he had a fifth place on stage 8 from Turin to Milan and a ninth place on stage 5 from Rome to Florence. His best overall Giro result was the 18th place in the 1913 Giro d'Italia.

His career was less successful than those of his brothers Ernesto and Giuseppe. However, he was known for giving them advice supporting them during their careers.

Azzini died, like his brother, from tuberculosis, on 9 July 1937, aged 53.

== Major results ==
1908
1st Coppa del Re
1st Coppa Rho

1909
30th Overall Giro d'Italia

5th stage 8
9th stage 5

4th Milano–Modena
5th Italian National Road Race Championships
6th Giro di Lombardia
9th Giro del Veneto

3rd stage 1

1910
18th Overall Tour de France

3rd stage 11
6th stage 13

17th Overall Giro d'Italia

5th stage 2

2nd Coppa del Re
3rd Milano–Varese
5th Coppa Bastogi
6th Coppa Savone
8th Giro di Lombardia

1911
9th Giro d'Italia, stage 2
10th Milano–San Remo

1913
18th Overall Giro d'Italia

8th stage 8

=== Grand Tour and classic results timeline ===
| Grand Tour | 1908 | 1909 | 1910 | 1911 | 1912 | 1913 |
|---|---|---|---|---|---|---|
| Tour de France | — | — | 18 | — | — | — |
| Giro d'Italia | Not held | 30 | DNF | DNF | — | 18 |
| Monument | 1908 | 1909 | 1910 | 1911 | 1912 | 1913 |
| Milan–San Remo | — | 17 | DNF | 10 | DNF | DNF |
| Giro di Lombardia | — | 6 | 8 | 15 | — | — |
| Classic | 1908 | 1909 | 1910 | 1911 | 1912 | 1913 |
| Milano–Torino | Not held | | | 14 | Not held | 21 |
| Giro del Piemonte | — | Not held | — | 18 | — | — |
