= Aldo Bettini =

Italian cyclist (1886–1929)

Personal information
- Born: 21 June 1886 Bologna, Italy
- Died: 16 January 1929 (aged 42)

Cycling career
- Sport: Cycling
- Discipline: Road
- Role: Rider

Professional teams
- 1908: Peugeot
- 1909–1910: Alcyon

Major wins
- Nice–Anton–Nice (1913)

Aldo Bettini (21 June 1886 – 16 January 1929) was an Italian-French professional road cyclist. He competed professionally from 1908 to 1910.

== Career ==
Bettini, originally from Emilia-Romagna, Italy, turned professional in 1908 and rode for the Peugeot and Alcyon teams. He achieved two times a top-10 overall in the Tour de France; in the 1909 edition and 1910 edition. He also participated in the 1910 Paris–Roubaix, finishing 15th. In 1913 he won Nice–Anton–Nice. Bettini became after his cycling career a naturalized French citizen in 1929.

== Major results ==
1909
10th Overall Tour de France
1910
10th Overall Tour de France
1911
(silver) French National Cyclo-cross Championships
1913
1st Nice–Anton–Nice

=== Grand Tour general classification and classic races results ===
| Stage races | 1908 | 1909 | 1910 |
|---|---|---|---|
| Tour de France | 19th | 10th | 10th |

| Classic cycle races | 1910 |
|---|---|
| Paris–Roubaix | 15th |
