= Auguste Dufour =

French cyclist

Personal information
- Born: 29 April 1882

Cycling career
- Sport: Cycling
- Discipline: Road
- Role: Rider

Auguste Dufour (born 29 April 1882, date of death unknown) was a French racing cyclist. He rode in the 1927 Tour de France.
