= 1911 Paris–Tours =

Race details
- Dates: 2 April 1911
- Stages: 1
- Distance: 248 km (154 mi)
- Winning time: 9h 10' 00"

Results
	Winner	Octave Lapize (FRA)
	Second	Cyrille van Hauwaert (BEL)
	Third	Émile Engel (FRA)

The 1911 Paris–Tours was the eighth edition of the Paris–Tours cycle race and was held on 2 April 1911. The race started in Paris and finished in Tours. The race was won by Octave Lapize.

== General classification ==
Final general classification

Rank	Rider	Time
1	Octave Lapize (FRA)	9h 10' 00"
2	Cyrille van Hauwaert (BEL)	+ 0"
3	Émile Engel (FRA)	+ 0"
4	Alphonse Charpiot (FRA)	+ 0"
5	Omer Verschoore (BEL)	+ 0"
6	Philippe Pautrat (FRA)	+ 2' 00"
7	Georges Lorgeou (FRA)	+ 2' 00"
8	Charles Cruchon (FRA)	+ 2' 00"
9	René Vandenberghe (BEL)	+ 5' 00"
10	Ernest Ricaux (FRA)	+ 5' 00"
