= 1910 Paris–Roubaix =

Cycling race

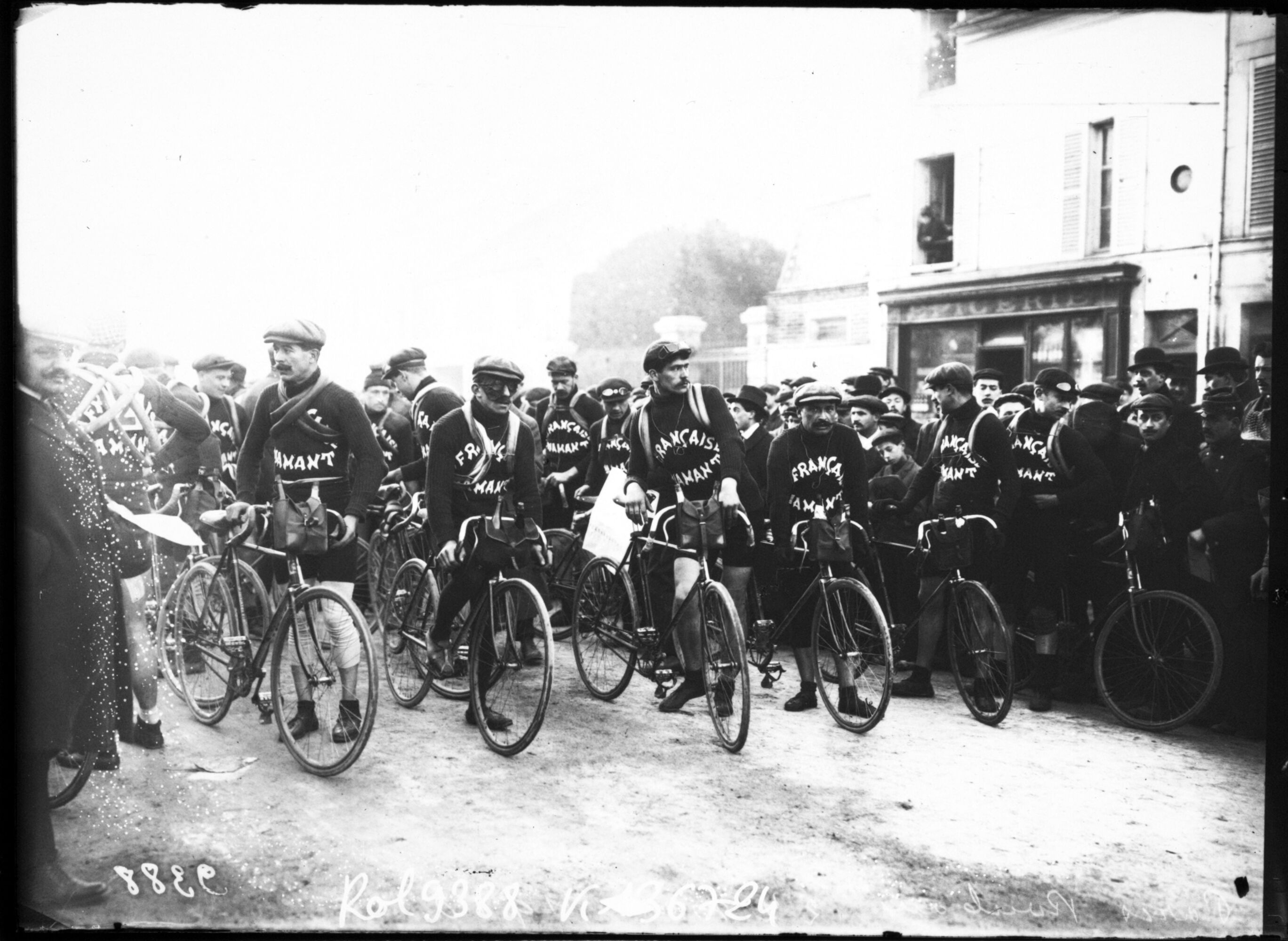

Race details
- Dates: 27 March 1910
- Stages: 1
- Distance: 266 km (165 mi)
- Winning time: 9h 5' 12"

Results
	Winner	Octave Lapize (FRA)
	Second	Cyrille Van Houwaert (BEL)
	Third	Eugène Christophe (BEL)

The 1910 Paris–Roubaix was the 15th edition of the Paris–Roubaix, a classic one-day cycle race in France. The single day event was held on 27 March 1910 and stretched 266 km (165 mi) from Paris to its end in a velodrome in Roubaix. The winner of this race for professionals was Octave Lapize from France.

In addition to the race for professionals, there were two related Paris–Roubaix events in 1910. On 15 May, the race was run for amateurs, as the first leg of the Paris–Brussels race. The winner of this stage was Louis Mottiat. Two weeks later, there was another Paris–Roubaix race, this time for independents. This was won by Marcel Baumier.

== Results ==
Final results (1–10)
Rank	Cyclist	Time
1	Octave Lapize (FRA)	9h 5' 12″
2	Cyrille Van Houwaert (BEL)	+0' 00″
3	Eugène Christophe (FRA)	+0' 00″
4	Édouard Léonard (FRA)	+0' 48″
5	Charles Crupelandt (FRA)	+7' 33″
6	René Vandenberghe (BEL)	+12' 48″
7	Léon Georget (FRA)	+12' 49″
8	Jules Messelis (BEL)	+15' 18″
9	Gustave Garrigou (FRA)	+17' 48″
10	Joseph Van Daele (BEL)	+17' 48″
