= Julien Maitron =

French cyclist

Personal information
- Full name: Julien Maitron
- Born: 20 February 1881 Dompierre-sur-Nièvre, France
- Died: 29 October 1972 (aged 91) Tourriers, France

Cycling career
- Sport: Cycling
- Discipline: Road
- Role: Rider

Major wins
- One stage Tour de France

Julien Maitron (20 February 1881 in Dompierre-sur-Nièvre – 29 October 1972 in Tourriers) was a French professional road bicycle racer, who competed in the 1904 to 1912 Tours de France. He won one stage in the 1910 Tour de France, and had his best overall position in the 1904 Tour de France when he finished fifth.

== Major results ==
1910
Tour de France:

Winner stage 6
