= Charles Crupelandt =

French cyclist

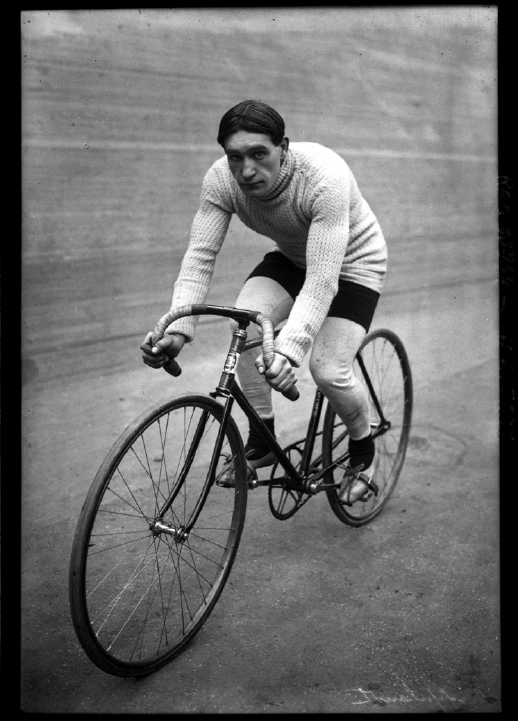
- Crupelandt in 1913

Personal information
- Full name: Charles Crupelandt
- Nicknames: Le Taureau du Nord (The Bull of the North)
- Born: 23 October 1886 Wattrelos, France
- Died: 18 February 1955 (aged 68) Roubaix, France

Cycling career
- Sport: Cycling
- Discipline: Road
- Role: Rider

Professional teams
- 1910: Le Globe
- 1911–1914: La Française-Diamant

Major wins
- Grand Tours Tour de France 4 individual stages (1910, 1911, 1912) One-day races and Classics Paris–Roubaix (1912, 1914)

Charles Crupelandt (23 October 1886 – 18 February 1955) was a French professional road bicycle racer. He won stages in the Tour de France, but his biggest successes were the 1912 and 1914 Paris–Roubaix. The last cobbled section (300m) of the race, just before the velodrome, is named Espace Charles Crupelandt.

Jean Metzinger, 1912, At the Cycle-Race Track (Au Vélodrome), oil and sand on canvas, 130.4 cm × 97.1 cm (51.3 in × 38.2 in) The Solomon R. Guggenheim Foundation, Peggy Guggenheim Collection, Venice

In 1912 Charles Crupelandt became the subject of a painting by the Cubist artist and theorist Jean Metzinger. Au Vélodrome, also known as At the Cycle-Race Track and Le cycliste, illustrates the final meters of the Paris–Roubaix race and portrays its 1912 winner. Metzinger's painting was the first in Modernist art to represent a specific sporting event and its champion. He incorporated into the painting his concepts of multiple perspective, simultaneity, and time, according to his belief that the fourth dimension was crucial to the new art that could compete with the classical French tradition. The painting was acquired by Peggy Guggenheim in 1945 and is now permanently on view in the Peggy Guggenheim Collection museum in Venice.

Crupelandt went to war and returned a hero, with the Croix de Guerre. Three years into peace, however, he fell foul of the law and was found guilty. The Union Vélocipédique banned him for life, possibly at the urging of rivals in cycling.

Crupelandt raced again but with an unofficial cycling association, with which he won national championships in 1922 and 1923. He died in 1955, blind and with both legs amputated.

== Major results ==
1910
Tour de France:

Winner 1st stage
Leading general classification for 1 day
6th place overall classification

1911
Tour de France:

Winner 4th and 7th stage
4th place overall classification

1912
Tour de France:

Winner 1st stage
Leading general classification for 1 day

Paris–Roubaix
1913
Paris–Tours
1914
France national road race champion
Paris–Roubaix
