= Charles Cruchon =

French cyclist

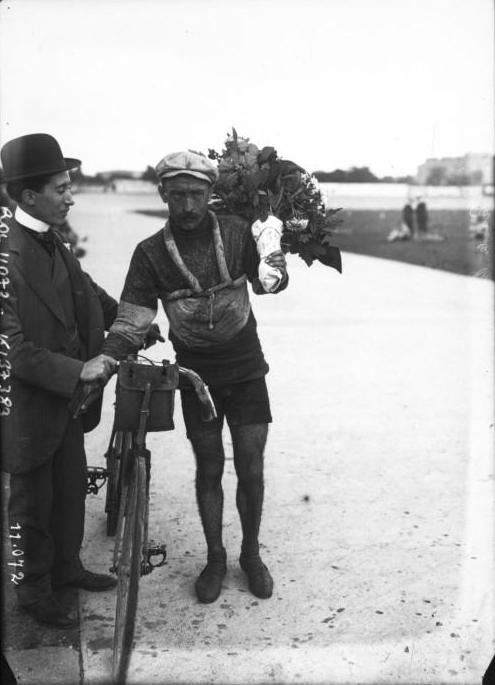

Personal information
- Full name: Charles Cruchon
- Born: 20 March 1883 Paris, France
- Died: 28 February 1956 (aged 72) Paris, France

Cycling career
- Sport: Cycling
- Discipline: Road
- Role: Rider

Professional team
- 1907–1911: –

Major wins
- Tour of Belgium 1907

Charles Cruchon was a French cyclist of the early 1900s and 1910s. He was born in Paris in 1883.

He took part in the Tour of Belgium in 1907, as well as finishing in the top ten in two Tours de France in 1910 and 1911.

He died in 1956 in Paris.

== Major competitions ==
- 1907 Tour of Belgium - 1st place
- 1908 Tour de France - did not finish
- 1909 Tour de France - did not finish
- 1910 Tour de France - 5th place
- 1911 Tour de France - 7th place
- 1912 Tour de France - did not finish
- 1913 Tour de France - did not finish
- 1914 Tour de France - 35th place
