= Constant Ménager =

French cyclist

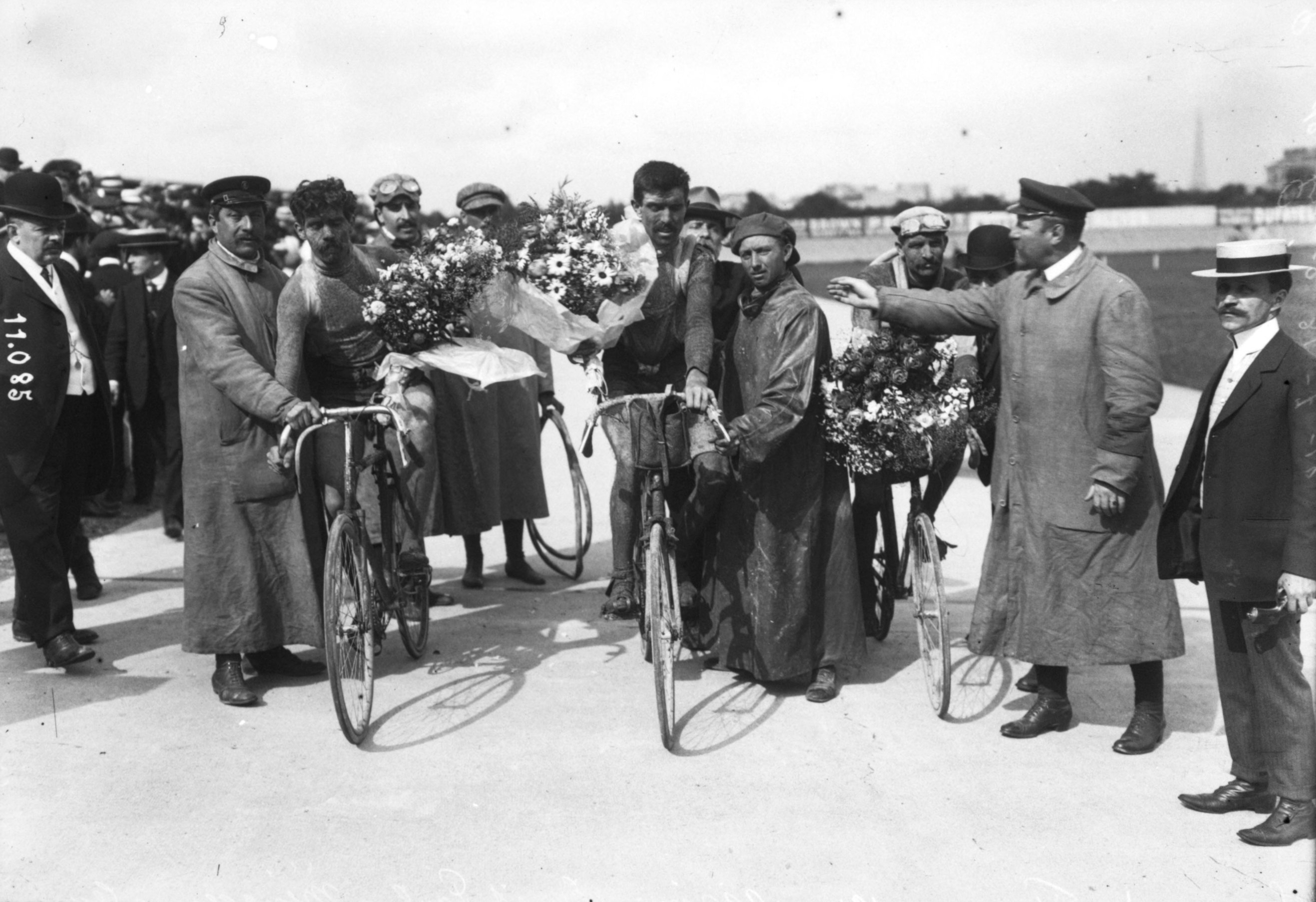

Personal information
- Full name: Constant Ménager
- Born: 15 April 1889 Montataire, France
- Died: 19 December 1970 (aged 81) Amiens, France

Cycling career
- Sport: Cycling
- Discipline: Road
- Role: Rider

Major wins
- One stage 1909 Tour de France

Constant Ménager (15 April 1889 in Montataire – 19 December 1970 in Amiens) was a French professional road bicycle racer. In 1909, he won the ninth stage of the 1909 Tour de France, and finished 7th in the overall classification.

== Major results ==
1909
Imola-Piacenza-Imola
Tour de France:

Winner stage 9
