= Octave Lapize =

French cyclist

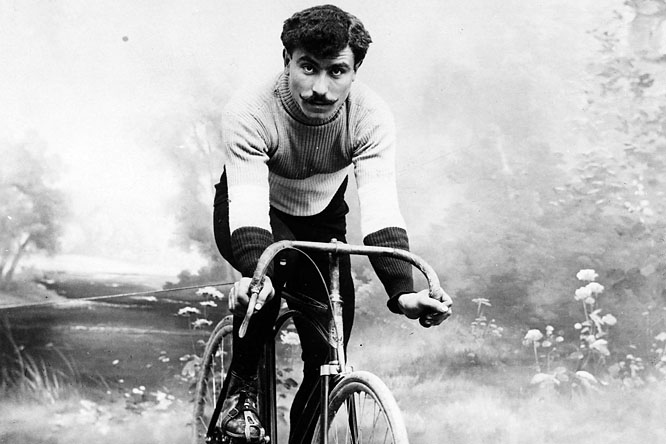

Personal information
- Full name: Octave Lapize
- Nicknames: Tatave; Le Frisé (The Curly Haired-One)
- Born: 24 October 1887 Paris, France
- Died: 14 July 1917 (aged 29) Toul, France

Cycling career
- Sport: Cycling
- Discipline: Road
- Role: Rider

Major wins
- Grand Tours Tour de France General classification (1910) 6 individual stages (1910, 1912, 1914) One-day races and Classics Paris–Roubaix (1909, 1910, 1911) Paris–Tours (1911) Paris–Brussels (1911, 1912, 1913)
Medal record
Representing France
Men's track cycling
Olympic Games
Bronze medal – third place	1908 London	100 kilometres

Octave Lapize (pronounced [ɔktav lapiz]; 24 October 1887 – 14 July 1917) was a French professional road racing cyclist and track cyclist.

Most famous for winning the 1910 Tour de France and a bronze medal at the 1908 Summer Olympics in the men's 100 kilometres, he was a three-time winner of one-day classics, Paris–Roubaix and Paris–Brussels.

== Career ==
In his first Tour De France in 1909, he abandoned early due to wintery conditions during the month of July, but not before he managed a Stage 2 second place behind Tour winner Francois Faber. The following year he went head-to-head with Alcyon teammate Faber who led comfortably until colliding with a dog at the foot of the Pyrenees. Lapize finally won by just 4 points helped by a number of punctures to Faber's bike on the final stage from Caen to Paris. In a total of six starts in the Tour De France between 1909 and 1914, this victory was the only one he finished.

While climbing the Col d'Aubsique (via the Col du Soulor and the Col de Tortes) in the 1910 Tour de France he is reported to have said to the race organisers: "Vous êtes des criminels !"' (French for 'You are criminals!')" Later, at the stage finish in Bayonne, he is reported to have told a reporter that "Desgrange est un assassin" (French for 'Desgrange is a murderer!") The stage in question was 326 kilometers in length and featured the climbs of the Col de Peyresourde, Col d'Aspin, Col du Tourmalet, Col du Soulor, Col de Tortes and the Col d'Aubisque. Lapize won the stage.

The First World War ended his cycling career. As a fighter pilot in the French army, Octave Lapize was shot down near Flirey, Meurthe-et-Moselle on 14 July 1917. Fatally wounded, he died in a hospital in Toul.

== Career achievements ==
=== Major results ===
1908
Summer Olympics Men's 100 kilometres - Bronze Medal
1909
Paris–Roubaix, 1st Place
1910
Tour de France - 1st Overall and 4 stage wins (Stage 5, 9, 10, 14)
Paris–Roubaix, 1st Place
1911
Paris–Roubaix, 1st Place
Paris–Tours, 1st Place
Paris–Brussels, 1st Place
(France) French National Championships, 1st Place
1912
Tour de France - Stage 6 win
Paris–Brussels, 1st Place
(France) French National Championships, 1st Place
1913
Paris–Brussels, 1st Place
(France) French National Championships, 1st Place
1914
Tour de France - Stage 8 win

=== Grand Tour results ===
	1909	1910	1911	1912	1913	1914
Giro d'Italia	DNE	DNE	DNE	DNE	DNE	DNE
Stages won	—	—	—	—	—	—
Tour de France	DNF-4	1	DNF-4	DNF-9	DNF-3	DNF-10
Stages won	0	4	0	1	0	1
Vuelta a España	N/A	N/A	N/A	N/A	N/A	N/A
Stages won	N/A	N/A	N/A	N/A	N/A	N/A

Legend
1	Winner
2–3	Top three-finish
4–10	Top ten-finish
11–	Other finish
DNE	Did not enter
DNF-x	Did not finish (retired on stage x)
DNS-x	Did not start (not started on stage x)
HD-x	Finished outside time limit (occurred on stage x)
DSQ	Disqualified
N/A	Race/classification not held
NR	Not ranked in this classification

== See also ==
- List of Olympians killed in World War I
