= 1914 Tour de France, Stage 9 to Stage 15 =

Cycling race stages

Route of the 1914 Tour de France

The 1914 Tour de France was the 12th edition of Tour de France, one of cycling's Grand Tours. The Tour began in Paris on 28 June and Stage 9 occurred on 14 July with a mountainous stage from Marseille. The race finished in Paris on 26 July.

== Stage 9 ==
14 July 1914 — Marseille to Nice, 356 km (221 mi)

Stage 9 result

Rank	Rider	Team	Time
1	Jean Rossius (BEL)	Alcyon-Soly	12h 35' 38"
2	Henri Pélissier (FRA)	Peugeot-Wolber	+ 6' 54"
3	Philippe Thys (BEL)	Peugeot-Wolber	s.t.
4	Jean Alavoine (FRA)	Peugeot-Wolber	+ 8' 12"
5	Marcel Godivier (FRA)	Gladiator-Dunlop	+ 13' 30"
6	Émile Georget (FRA)	Peugeot-Wolber	+ 20' 13"
7	Jules Nempon (FRA)	JB Louvet-Continental	+ 22' 10"
8	Camille Botte (BEL)	Lone rider	+ 30' 01"
9	Jacques Coomans (BEL)	Thomann-Soly	+ 31' 07"
10	Angelo Erba (ITA)	Alleluia-Continental	+ 34' 27"

General classification after stage 9

Rank	Rider	Team	Time
1	Philippe Thys (BEL)	Peugeot-Wolber	
2	Henri Pélissier (FRA)	Peugeot-Wolber	+ 44' 30"
3	Jean Alavoine (FRA)	Peugeot-Wolber	+ 55' 38"
4			
5			
6			
7			
8			
9			
10			

== Stage 10 ==
16 July 1914 — Nice to Grenoble, 323 km (200.7 mi)

Stage 10 result

Rank	Rider	Team	Time
1	Henri Pélissier (FRA)	Peugeot-Wolber	13h 22' 03"
2	Jean Alavoine (FRA)	Peugeot-Wolber	s.t.
3	Firmin Lambot (BEL)	Peugeot-Wolber	s.t.
4	Philippe Thys (BEL)	Peugeot-Wolber	s.t.
5	Gustave Garrigou (FRA)	Peugeot-Wolber	+ 11' 18"
6	Hector Tiberghien (BEL)	Delage-Continental	s.t.
7	Émile Georget (FRA)	Peugeot-Wolber	+ 13' 53"
8	Jean Rossius (BEL)	Alcyon-Soly	+ 17' 58"
9	Alfons Spiessens (BEL)	JB Louvet-Continental	+ 35' 07"
10	Ernest Paul (FRA)	Delage-Continental	s.t.

General classification after stage 10

Rank	Rider	Team	Time
1	Philippe Thys (BEL)	Peugeot-Wolber	
2	Henri Pélissier (FRA)	Peugeot-Wolber	+ 34' 27"
3	Jean Alavoine (FRA)	Peugeot-Wolber	+ 47' 50"
4			
5			
6			
7			
8			
9			
10			

== Stage 11 ==
18 July 1914 — Grenoble to Geneva, 325 km (202 mi)

Stage 11 result

Rank	Rider	Team	Time
1	Gustave Garrigou (FRA)	Peugeot-Wolber	12h 29' 06"
2	Henri Pélissier (FRA)	Peugeot-Wolber	s.t.
3	Philippe Thys (BEL)	Peugeot-Wolber	s.t.
4	Paul Duboc (FRA)	Automoto-Continental	+ 11' 36"
5	Jean Alavoine (FRA)	Peugeot-Wolber	+ 16' 38"
6	Jean Rossius (BEL)	Alcyon-Soly	s.t.
7	Hector Tiberghien (BEL)	Delage-Continental	s.t.
8	Henri Devroye (BEL)	Armor-Soly	s.t.
9	François Faber (LUX)	Peugeot-Wolber	+ 31' 27"
10	Firmin Lambot (BEL)	Peugeot-Wolber	+ 32' 30"

General classification after stage 11

Rank	Rider	Team	Time
1	Philippe Thys (BEL)	Peugeot-Wolber	
2	Henri Pélissier (FRA)	Peugeot-Wolber	+ 34' 27"
3	Jean Alavoine (FRA)	Peugeot-Wolber	+ 1h 04' 28"
4			
5			
6			
7			
8			
9			
10			

== Stage 12 ==
20 July 1914 — Geneva to Belfort, 325 km (202 mi)

Stage 12 result

Rank	Rider	Team	Time
1	Henri Pélissier (FRA)	Peugeot-Wolber	12h 32' 05"
2	Jean Alavoine (FRA)	Peugeot-Wolber	+ 1' 15"
3	Paul Duboc (FRA)	Automoto-Continental	+ 2' 20"
4	Jean Rossius (BEL)	Alcyon-Soly	+ 2' 37"
5	Maurice Brocco (FRA)	Gladiator-Dunlop	s.t.
6	Philippe Thys (BEL)	Peugeot-Wolber	s.t.
7	Firmin Lambot (BEL)	Peugeot-Wolber	+ 3' 54"
8	Jacques Coomans (BEL)	Thomann-Soly	+ 7' 04"
9	Émile Georget (FRA)	Peugeot-Wolber	s.t.
10	Hector Tiberghien (BEL)	Delage-Continental	s.t.

General classification after stage 12

Rank	Rider	Team	Time
1	Philippe Thys (BEL)	Peugeot-Wolber	
2	Henri Pélissier (FRA)	Peugeot-Wolber	+ 31' 50"
3	Jean Alavoine (FRA)	Peugeot-Wolber	+ 1h 03' 06"
4			
5			
6			
7			
8			
9			
10			

== Stage 13 ==
22 July 1914 — Belfort to Longwy, 325 km (202 mi)

Stage 13 result

Rank	Rider	Team	Time
1	François Faber (LUX)	Peugeot-Wolber	10h 30' 44"
2	Henri Pélissier (FRA)	Peugeot-Wolber	+ 6' 18"
3	Jean Alavoine (FRA)	Peugeot-Wolber	s.t.
4	Philippe Thys (BEL)	Peugeot-Wolber	s.t.
5	Jean Rossius (BEL)	Alcyon-Soly	s.t.
6	Hector Tiberghien (BEL)	Delage-Continental	s.t.
7	Charles Charron (FRA)	Delage-Continental	s.t.
8	Paul Duboc (FRA)	Automoto-Continental	s.t.
9	Don Kirkham (AUS)	Phebus-Dunlop	s.t.
10	Émile Georget (FRA)	Peugeot-Wolber	s.t.

General classification after stage 13

Rank	Rider	Team	Time
1	Philippe Thys (BEL)	Peugeot-Wolber	
2	Henri Pélissier (FRA)	Peugeot-Wolber	+ 31' 50"
3	Jean Alavoine (FRA)	Peugeot-Wolber	+ 1h 03' 06"
4			
5			
6			
7			
8			
9			
10			

== Stage 14 ==
24 July 1914 — Longwy to Dunkerque, 390 km (240 mi)

Stage 14 result

Rank	Rider	Team	Time
1	François Faber (LUX)	Peugeot-Wolber	15h 03' 16"
2	Henri Pélissier (FRA)	Peugeot-Wolber	s.t.
3	Philippe Thys (BEL)	Peugeot-Wolber	s.t.
4	Jean Alavoine (FRA)	Peugeot-Wolber	+ 1' 21"
5	Émile Georget (FRA)	Peugeot-Wolber	+ 5' 17"
6	Louis Trousselier (FRA)	Automoto-Continental	s.t.
7	Hector Tiberghien (BEL)	Delage-Continental	s.t.
8	Alfons Spiessens (BEL)	JB Louvet-Continental	s.t.
9	Julien Tuytten (BEL)	Lone rider	s.t.
10	Jean Rossius (BEL)	Alcyon-Soly	+ 6' 47"

General classification after stage 14

Rank	Rider	Team	Time
1	Philippe Thys (BEL)	Peugeot-Wolber	
2	Henri Pélissier (FRA)	Peugeot-Wolber	+ 1' 50"
3	Jean Alavoine (FRA)	Peugeot-Wolber	+ 34' 27"
4			
5			
6			
7			
8			
9			
10			

== Stage 15 ==
26 July 1914 — Dunkerque to Paris, 340 km (210 mi)

Stage 15 result

Rank	Rider	Team	Time
1	Henri Pélissier (FRA)	Peugeot-Wolber	13h 21' 16"
2	Jean Rossius (BEL)	Alcyon-Soly	s.t.
3	Maurice Brocco (FRA)	Gladiator-Dunlop	s.t.
4	Philippe Thys (BEL)	Peugeot-Wolber	s.t.
5	Louis Trousselier (FRA)	Automoto-Continental	+ 1' 11"
6	François Faber (LUX)	JB Louvet-Continental	+ 2' 01"
7	Oscar Egg (SUI)	Peugeot-Wolber	s.t.
8	Marcel Godivier (FRA)	Gladiator-Dunlop	s.t.
9	Paul Duboc (FRA)	Automoto-Continental	s.t.
10	Iddo Munro (AUS)	Phebus-Dunlop	s.t.

General classification after stage 15

Rank	Rider	Team	Time
1	Philippe Thys (BEL)	Peugeot-Wolber	200h 28' 48"
2	Henri Pélissier (FRA)	Peugeot-Wolber	+ 1' 50"
3	Jean Alavoine (FRA)	Peugeot-Wolber	+ 36' 53"
4	Jean Rossius (BEL)	Alcyon-Soly	+ 1h 57' 05"
5	Gustave Garrigou (FRA)	Peugeot-Wolber	+ 3h 00' 21"
6	Émile Georget (FRA)	Peugeot-Wolber	+ 3h 20' 59"
7	Alfons Spiessens (BEL)	JB Louvet-Continental	+ 3h 53' 55"
8	Firmin Lambot (BEL)	Peugeot-Wolber	+ 5h 08' 54"
9	François Faber (LUX)	Peugeot-Wolber	+ 6h 15' 53"
10	Louis Heusghem (BEL)	Peugeot-Wolber	+ 7h 49' 02"
