= 1914 Tour de France, Stage 1 to Stage 8 =

Cycling race stages

Route of the 1914 Tour de France

The 1914 Tour de France was the 12th edition of Tour de France, one of cycling's Grand Tours. The Tour began in Paris on 28 June and Stage 8 occurred on 12 July with a flat stage to Marseille. The race finished in Paris on 26 July.

== Stage 1 ==
28 June 1914 — Paris to Le Havre, 388 km (241.1 mi)

This stage happened on the same day as the assassination of Archduke Franz Ferdinand of Austria.

Stage 1 result and general classification after stage 1

Rank	Rider	Team	Time
=1	Philippe Thys (BEL)	Peugeot-Wolber	13h 18' 28"
=1	Jean Rossius (BEL)	Alcyon-Soly	s.t.
3	Gustave Garrigou (FRA)	Peugeot-Wolber	s.t.
4	Costante Girardengo (ITA)	Automoto-Continental	s.t.
5	Louis Mottiat (BEL)	Alcyon-Soly	s.t.
6	Paul Deman (BEL)	Alcyon-Soly	s.t.
7	Henri Pélissier (FRA)	Peugeot-Wolber	s.t.
8	Émile Georget (FRA)	Peugeot-Wolber	s.t.
9	Octave Lapize (FRA)	La Française-Hutchinson	s.t.
10	Dieudonné Gauthy (BEL)	Alcyon-Soly	s.t.

== Stage 2 ==
30 June 1914 — Le Havre to Cherbourg-en-Cotentin, 364 km (226.2 mi)

Stage 2 result

Rank	Rider	Team	Time
1	Jean Rossius (BEL)	Alcyon-Soly	12h 15' 26"
2	Philippe Thys (BEL)	Peugeot-Wolber	s.t.
3	Émile Engel (FRA)	Peugeot-Wolber	+ 1' 38"
4	Odile Defraye (BEL)	Alcyon-Soly	+ 5' 45"
5	Henri Pélissier (FRA)	Peugeot-Wolber	+ 7' 16"
6	Émile Georget (FRA)	Peugeot-Wolber	s.t.
7	Oscar Egg (SUI)	Peugeot-Wolber	s.t.
8	Jean Alavoine (FRA)	Peugeot-Wolber	+ 9' 13"
9	Gustave Garrigou (FRA)	Peugeot-Wolber	s.t.
10	Vincenzo Borgarello (ITA)	Clément-Dunlop	+ 10' 37"

General classification after stage 2

Rank	Rider	Team	Time
=1	Philippe Thys (BEL)	Peugeot-Wolber	
=1	Jean Rossius (BEL)	Alcyon-Soly	s.t.
3	Henri Pélissier (FRA)	Peugeot-Wolber	+ 7' 16"
4			
5			
6			
7			
8			
9			
10			

== Stage 3 ==
2 July 1914 — Cherbourg-en-Cotentin to Brest, 405 km (252 mi)

Stage 3 result

Rank	Rider	Team	Time
1	Émile Engel (FRA)	Peugeot-Wolber	14h 58' 06"
2	Louis Mottiat (BEL)	Alcyon-Soly	s.t.
3	Marcel Buysse (BEL)	Alcyon-Soly	s.t.
4	Odile Defraye (BEL)	Alcyon-Soly	s.t.
=5	Henri Pélissier (FRA)	Peugeot-Wolber	s.t.
=5	Philippe Thys (BEL)	Peugeot-Wolber	s.t.
=5	Lucien Mazan (FRA)	Automoto-Continental	s.t.
=5	Octave Lapize (FRA)	La Française-Hutchinson	s.t.
=5	Émile Georget (FRA)	Peugeot-Wolber	s.t.
=5	Maurice Brocco (FRA)	Gladiator-Dunlop	s.t.

General classification after stage 3

Rank	Rider	Team	Time
=1	Philippe Thys (BEL)	Peugeot-Wolber	
=1	Jean Rossius (BEL)	Alcyon-Soly	s.t.
3	Henri Pélissier (FRA)	Peugeot-Wolber	+ 7' 16"
4			
5			
6			
7			
8			
9			
10			

== Stage 4 ==
4 July 1914 — Brest to La Rochelle, 470 km (290 mi)

Stage 4 result

Rank	Rider	Team	Time
1	Oscar Egg (SUI)	Peugeot-Wolber	16h 13' 45"
2	Henri Pélissier (FRA)	Peugeot-Wolber	s.t.
3	Émile Engel (FRA)	Peugeot-Wolber	+ 1' 46"
=4	Jean Rossius (BEL)	Alcyon-Soly	+ 1' 49"
=4	Jean Alavoine (FRA)	Peugeot-Wolber	s.t.
=4	François Faber (LUX)	Peugeot-Wolber	s.t.
=4	Alfons Spiessens (BEL)	JB Louvet-Continental	s.t.
=4	Émile Georget (FRA)	Peugeot-Wolber	s.t.
=4	Gustave Garrigou (FRA)	Peugeot-Wolber	s.t.
=4	Philippe Thys (BEL)	Peugeot-Wolber	s.t.

General classification after stage 4

Rank	Rider	Team	Time
=1	Philippe Thys (BEL)	Peugeot-Wolber	
=1	Jean Rossius (BEL)	Alcyon-Soly	s.t.
3	Henri Pélissier (FRA)	Peugeot-Wolber	+ 5' 27"
4			
5			
6			
7			
8			
9			
10			

== Stage 5 ==
6 July 1914 — La Rochelle to Bayonne, 376 km (234 mi)

Stage 5 result

Rank	Rider	Team	Time
1	Oscar Egg (SUI)	Peugeot-Wolber	13h 25' 29"
2	Odile Defraye (BEL)	Alcyon-Soly	s.t.
3	Philippe Thys (BEL)	Peugeot-Wolber	s.t.
4	Louis Mottiat (BEL)	Alcyon-Soly	s.t.
5	Henri Pélissier (FRA)	Peugeot-Wolber	s.t.
6	Jean Rossius (BEL)	Alcyon-Soly	s.t.
7	Octave Lapize (FRA)	La Française-Hutchinson	s.t.
8	Pietro Fasoli (ITA)	JB Louvet-Continental	s.t.
9	Jean Alavoine (FRA)	Peugeot-Wolber	s.t.
10	Lucien Mazan (FRA)	Automoto-Continental	s.t.

General classification after stage 5

Rank	Rider	Team	Time
=1	Philippe Thys (BEL)	Peugeot-Wolber	
=1	Jean Rossius (BEL)	Alcyon-Soly	s.t.
3	Henri Pélissier (FRA)	Peugeot-Wolber	+ 5' 27"
4			
5			
6			
7			
8			
9			
10			

== Stage 6 ==
7 July 1914 — Bayonne to Luchon, 326 km (203 mi)

Stage 6 result

Rank	Rider	Team	Time
1	Firmin Lambot (BEL)	Peugeot-Wolber	14h 39' 04"
2	Philippe Thys (BEL)	Peugeot-Wolber	+ 7' 40"
3	Jean Alavoine (FRA)	Peugeot-Wolber	+ 26' 07"
4	Henri Pélissier (FRA)	Peugeot-Wolber	+ 38' 39"
5	Angelo Erba (ITA)	Alleluia-Continental	+ 42' 13"
6	Émile Georget (FRA)	Peugeot-Wolber	+ 43' 58"
7	Marcel Buysse (BEL)	Alcyon-Soly	+ 47' 22"
8	Odile Defraye (BEL)	Alcyon-Soly	+ 54' 13"
9	Louis Heusghem (BEL)	Peugeot-Wolber	+ 57' 11"
10	Ottavio Pratesi (ITA)	Lone rider	+ 58' 34"

General classification after stage 6

Rank	Rider	Team	Time
1	Philippe Thys (BEL)	Peugeot-Wolber	
2	Henri Pélissier (FRA)	Peugeot-Wolber	+ 34' 27"
3	Jean Alavoine (FRA)	Peugeot-Wolber	+ 46' 23"
4			
5			
6			
7			
8			
9			
10			

== Stage 7 ==
10 July 1914 — Luchon to Perpignan, 323 km (201 mi)

Stage 7 result

Rank	Rider	Team	Time
1	Jean Alavoine (FRA)	Peugeot-Wolber	11h 47' 05"
2	Marcel Buysse (BEL)	Alcyon-Soly	s.t.
3	Philippe Thys (BEL)	Peugeot-Wolber	s.t.
4	Henri Pélissier (FRA)	Peugeot-Wolber	s.t.
5	Jean Rossius (BEL)	Alcyon-Soly	s.t.
6	Odile Defraye (BEL)	Alcyon-Soly	+ 5' 05"
7	Alfons Spiessens (BEL)	JB Louvet-Continental	s.t.
8	Oscar Egg (SUI)	Peugeot-Wolber	+ 15' 17"
9	Gustave Garrigou (FRA)	Peugeot-Wolber	s.t.
10	Henri Devroye (BEL)	Armor-Soly	+ 24' 53"

General classification after stage 7

Rank	Rider	Team	Time
1	Philippe Thys (BEL)	Peugeot-Wolber	
2	Henri Pélissier (FRA)	Peugeot-Wolber	+ 34' 27"
3	Jean Alavoine (FRA)	Peugeot-Wolber	+ 46' 23"
4			
5			
6			
7			
8			
9			
10			

== Stage 8 ==
12 July 1914 — Perpignan to Marseille, 370 km (229.9 mi)

Stage 8 result

Rank	Rider	Team	Time
1	Octave Lapize (FRA)	La Française-Hutchinson	13h 00' 00"
2	Maurice Brocco (FRA)	Gladiator-Dunlop	s.t.
3	Oscar Egg (SUI)	Peugeot-Wolber	s.t.
4	~~Émile Engel (FRA)~~	~~Peugeot-Wolber~~	~~s.t.~~
5	Louis Trousselier (FRA)	Automoto-Continental	s.t.
6	Marcel Buysse (BEL)	Alcyon-Soly	s.t.
7	Émile Georget (FRA)	Peugeot-Wolber	s.t.
8	Jean Rossius (BEL)	Alcyon-Soly	s.t.
9	Jules Nempon (FRA)	JB Louvet-Continental	s.t.
10	Pietro Fasoli (ITA)	JB Louvet-Continental	s.t.

General classification after stage 8

Rank	Rider	Team	Time
1	Philippe Thys (BEL)	Peugeot-Wolber	
2	Henri Pélissier (FRA)	Peugeot-Wolber	+ 34' 27"
3	Jean Alavoine (FRA)	Peugeot-Wolber	+ 46' 23"
4			
5			
6			
7			
8			
9			
10			
