= Trousselier =

Trousselier is a French surname. Notable people with the surname include:

- Louis Trousselier (1881–1939), French racing cyclist who won the 1905 Tour de France
- André Trousselier (1887–1968), French footballer and brother of the above
- Auguste Trousselier, French footballer and brother of the above
