= Charles Piercey =

Australian cyclist

Personal information
- Full name: Charles Alexander Piercey
- Born: 20 January 1890 Carlton, Victoria, Australia
- Died: 25 June 1966 (aged 76) Brielle, New Jersey, United States

Cycling career
- Sport: Cycling
- Role: Rider

Charles Piercey (20 January 1890 – 25 June 1966) was an Australian racing cyclist.

As a teenager he joined the Coburg Cycling Club and came to prominence at the age of 20 with a win in the Melbourne to Warrnambool Road Race. Piercey started the race with a 47-minute handicap and took 10:01:00 to complete the race. Later that year he was beaten by a wheel in the Austral Wheel Race that was held that year at the Melbourne Cricket Ground on a grass track. In the early years of his career he took part in the Melbourne Six Days Races in 1912 and 1913. At the time six-day racing was very popular in many parts of the world and usually featured international riders

In 1914 Piercey, together with Iddo "Snowy" Munro, Don Kirkham, Charlie Snell and George Bell, became part of the first team of Australian Cyclists to head off for racing in Europe, with the objective to be competing in the Tour de France. Initially the team rode as professionals for the Paris-based Gladiator Cycles & Clement Tyre team, competing in classic races like Milan–San Remo., Paris–Roubaix, Paris-Bruxelles, Paris-Nancy and the Tour of Belgium. Eventually only Munro and Kirkham were selected for participation in the Tour de France

Piercey was never to return to Australia; in early August 1914 he left from Liverpool for New York City with fellow Australian cyclist Fred Keefe to try their chances in the United States' track circuit. Newark, New Jersey and its famous track was to be their base. Still in 1914 Piercey was a contender in the Six Days of New York Race at Madison Square Garden, followed by another Six Days Race in New Jersey in December 1914. He retired from his cycling career in 1920.

A resident of Brielle, New Jersey after he retired from cycling, Piercey became an avid hunter and fisherman.
