= Pilbara bandy bandy =

Conservation status
- Least Concern (IUCN 3.1)

Scientific classification
- Kingdom: Animalia
- Phylum: Chordata
- Class: Reptilia
- Order: Squamata
- Suborder: Serpentes
- Family: Elapidae
- Genus: Vermicella
- Species: V. snelli

Binomial name
- Vermicella snelli Storr, 1968

Synonyms
- Vermicella annulata snelli Storr, 1968; Vermicella snelli — Cogger, 2000

Species of snake

The Pilbara bandy bandy (Vermicella snelli) is a species of venomous snake in the family Elapidae. The species is endemic to Australia.

== Etymology ==
The specific name, snelli, is in honor of Charles Snell who donated the holotype to the Western Australian Museum.

== Geographic range ==
V. snelli is found in the northern part of the Australian state of Western Australia.

== Habitat ==
The preferred natural habitats of V. snelli are grassland and shrubland.

== Reproduction ==
V. snelli is oviparous.
