= Neffati =

Neffati is a Tunisian surname. Notable people with the surname include:

- Ali Neffati (1895–1974), Tunisian cyclist
- Moutaz Neffati (born 2004), Tunisian footballer
