= General classification in the Tour de France =

Classification that determines the winner of the Tour de France

Yellow jersey
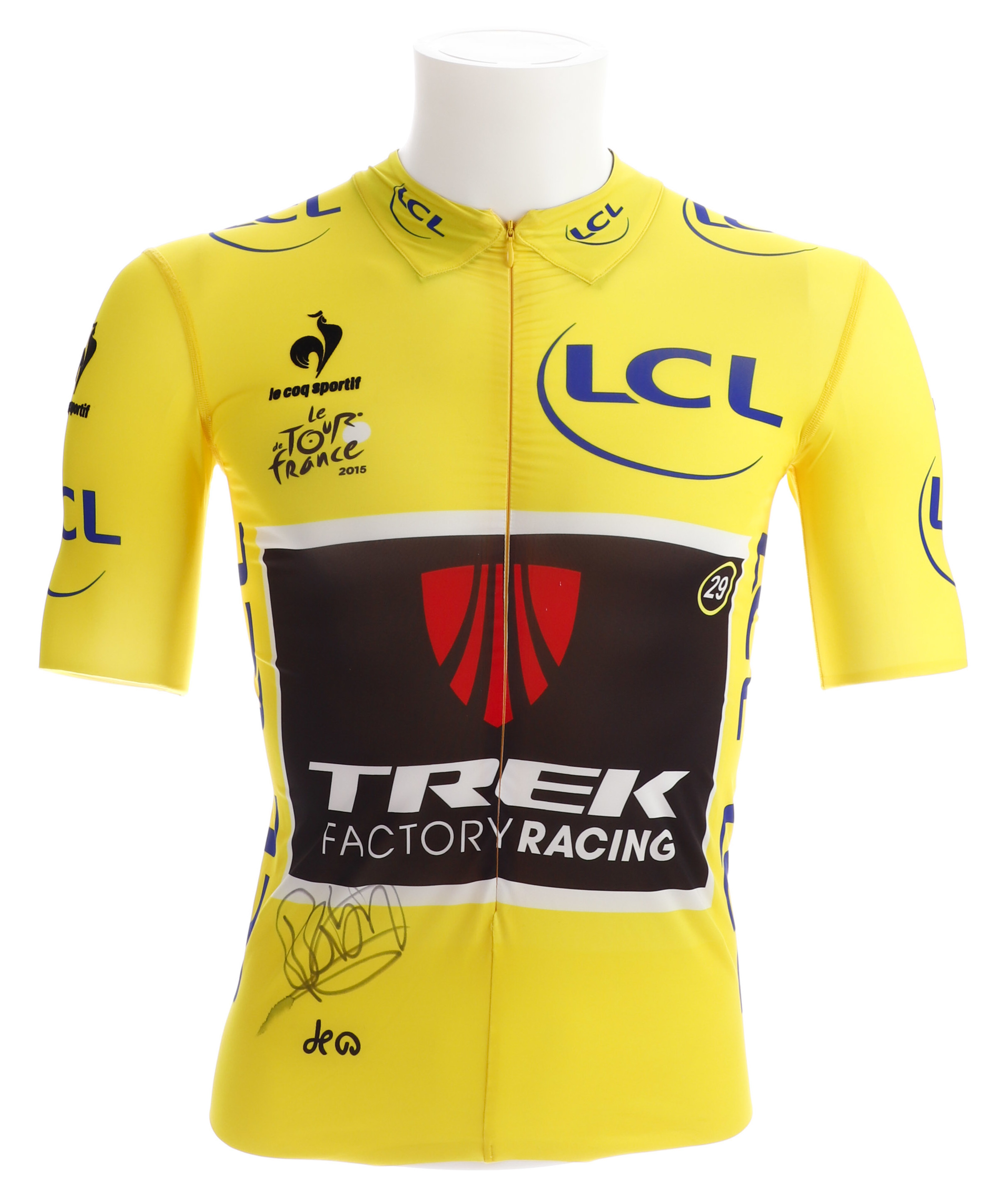
- The yellow jersey worn by Fabian Cancellara during 2015 Tour de France (collection KOERS. Museum of Cycle Racing)
- Sport: Road bicycle racing
- Competition: Tour de France
- Awarded for: Overall best time
- Local name: Maillot jaune (French)

History
- First award: 1903
- Editions: 113 (as of 2026)
- First winner: Maurice Garin (FRA)
- Most wins: Jacques Anquetil (FRA); Eddy Merckx (BEL); Bernard Hinault (FRA); Miguel Induráin (ESP); Tadej Pogačar (SLO) 5 wins each
- Most recent: Tadej Pogačar (SLO)

The general classification of the Tour de France is the most important classification of the race and determines the winner of the race. Since 1919, the leader of the general classification has worn the yellow jersey (French: maillot jaune [majo ʒon]).

== History ==
For the first two Tour de France races, the general classification standings were decided based on the lowest cumulative time. The winner of the first several Tour de France races wore a green armband instead of a yellow jersey. After the second Tour de France, the rules were changed, and the general classification was no longer calculated by time, but by points. This points system was kept until 1912, after which it changed back to the time classification.

There is doubt over when the yellow jersey began. The Belgian rider Philippe Thys, who won the Tour in 1913, 1914 and 1920, recalled in the Belgian magazine Champions et Vedettes when he was 67 that he was awarded a yellow jersey in 1913 when the organiser, Henri Desgrange, asked him to wear a coloured jersey. Thys declined, saying making himself more visible in yellow would encourage other riders to ride against him. He said

He then made his argument from another direction. Several stages later, it was my team manager at Peugeot, (Alphonse) Baugé, who urged me to give in. The yellow jersey would be an advertisement for the company and, that being the argument, I was obliged to concede. So a yellow jersey was bought in the first shop we came to. It was just the right size, although we had to cut a slightly larger hole for my head to go through.

He spoke of the next year's race, when "I won the first stage and was beaten by a tyre by Bossus in the second. On the following stage, the maillot jaune passed to Georget after a crash."

The Tour historian Jacques Augendre called Thys "a valorous rider... well-known for his intelligence" and said his claim "seems free from all suspicion". But: "No newspaper mentions a yellow jersey before the war. Being at a loss for witnesses, we can't solve this enigma."

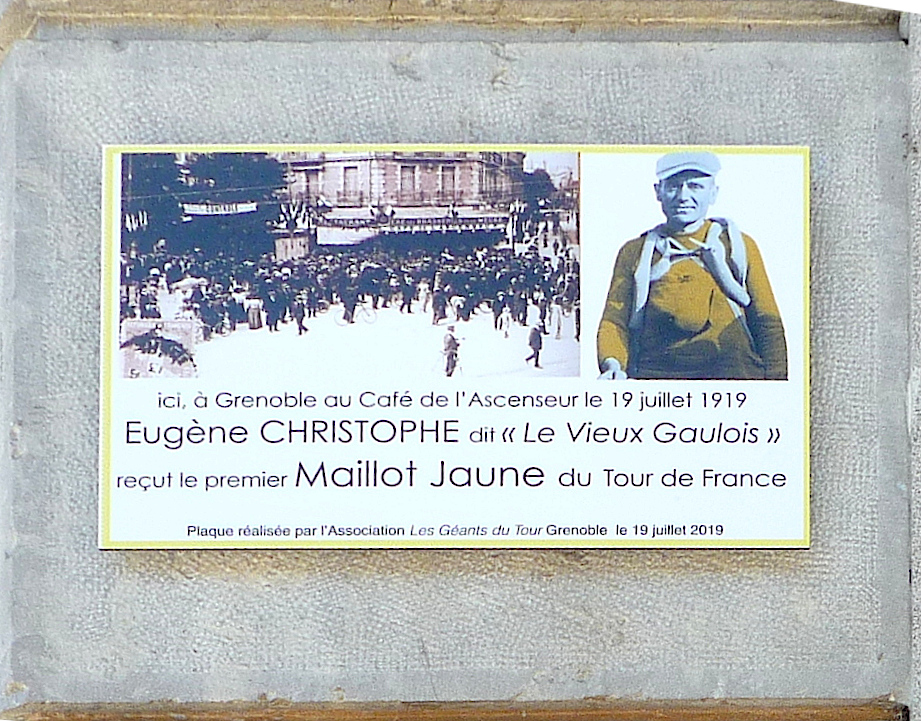
Plaque in the city of Grenoble, celebrating the centenary of the presentation of the first yellow jersey on 19 July 1919

According to the official history, the first yellow jersey was worn by the Frenchman Eugène Christophe in the stage from Grenoble to Geneva on July 19, 1919. Christophe disliked wearing it and complained that spectators imitated canaries whenever he passed. There was no formal presentation when Christophe wore his first yellow jersey in Grenoble, from where the race left at 2 am for the 325 km to Geneva. He was given it the night before and tried it on later in his hotel.

The colour was chosen either to reflect the yellow newsprint of the organising newspaper, L'Auto, or because yellow was an unpopular colour and therefore the only one available with which a manufacturer could create jerseys at late notice. The two possibilities have been promoted equally but the idea of matching the colour of Desgrange's newspaper seems more probable because Desgrange wrote: "This morning I gave the valiant Christophe a superb yellow jersey. You already know that our director decided that the man leading the race [de tête du classement général] should wear a jersey in the colours of L'Auto. The battle to wear this jersey is going to be passionate."

In the next Tour de France in 1920, the yellow jersey was initially not awarded but after the ninth stage, it was introduced again.

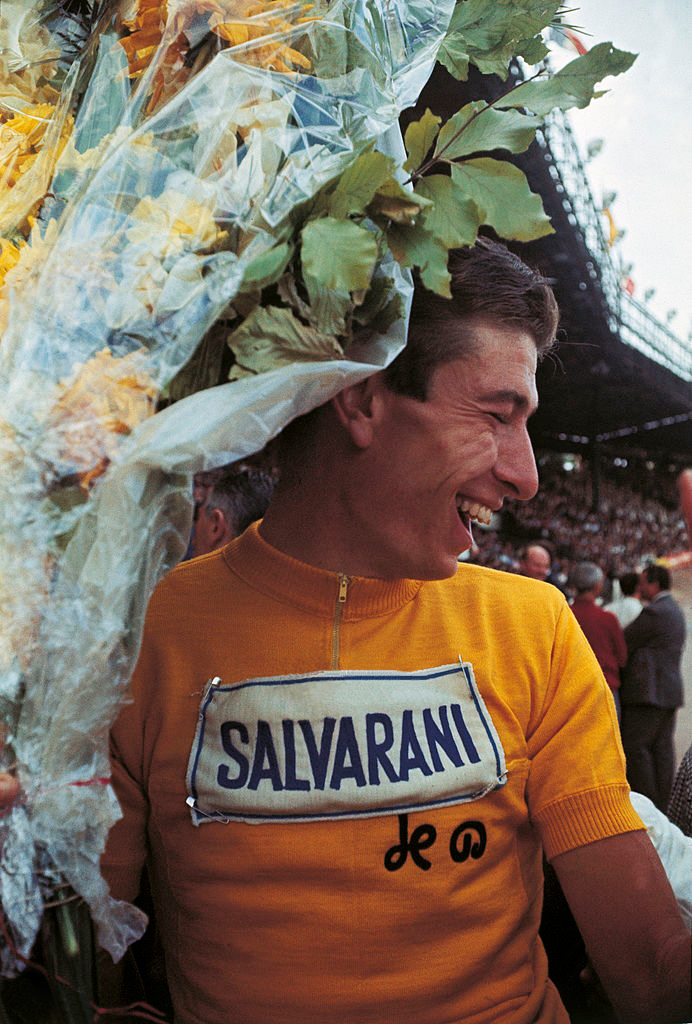
Winner of the 1965 Tour's general classification Felice Gimondi wearing the yellow jersey with the initials of Henri Desgrange, the first organiser of the Tour de France

After Desgrange's death, his stylized initials were added to the yellow jersey, originally on the chest. They moved in 1969 to the sleeve to make way for a logo advertising Virlux. A further advertisement for the clothing company Le Coq Sportif appeared at the bottom of the zip fastener at the neck, the first supplementary advertisement on the yellow jersey. Desgrange's initials returned to the front of the jersey in 1972. They were removed in 1984 to make way for a commercial logo but Nike added them again in 2003 as part of the Tour's centenary celebrations. One set of initials is now worn on the upper right chest of the jersey.

In 2013, a nighttime finish on the Champs-Élysées for the final stage was done to commemorate the race's 100th edition. Race leader Chris Froome wore a special yellow jersey covered in small translucent sequins into Paris as well as on the podium to allow him to be more visible under the lights.

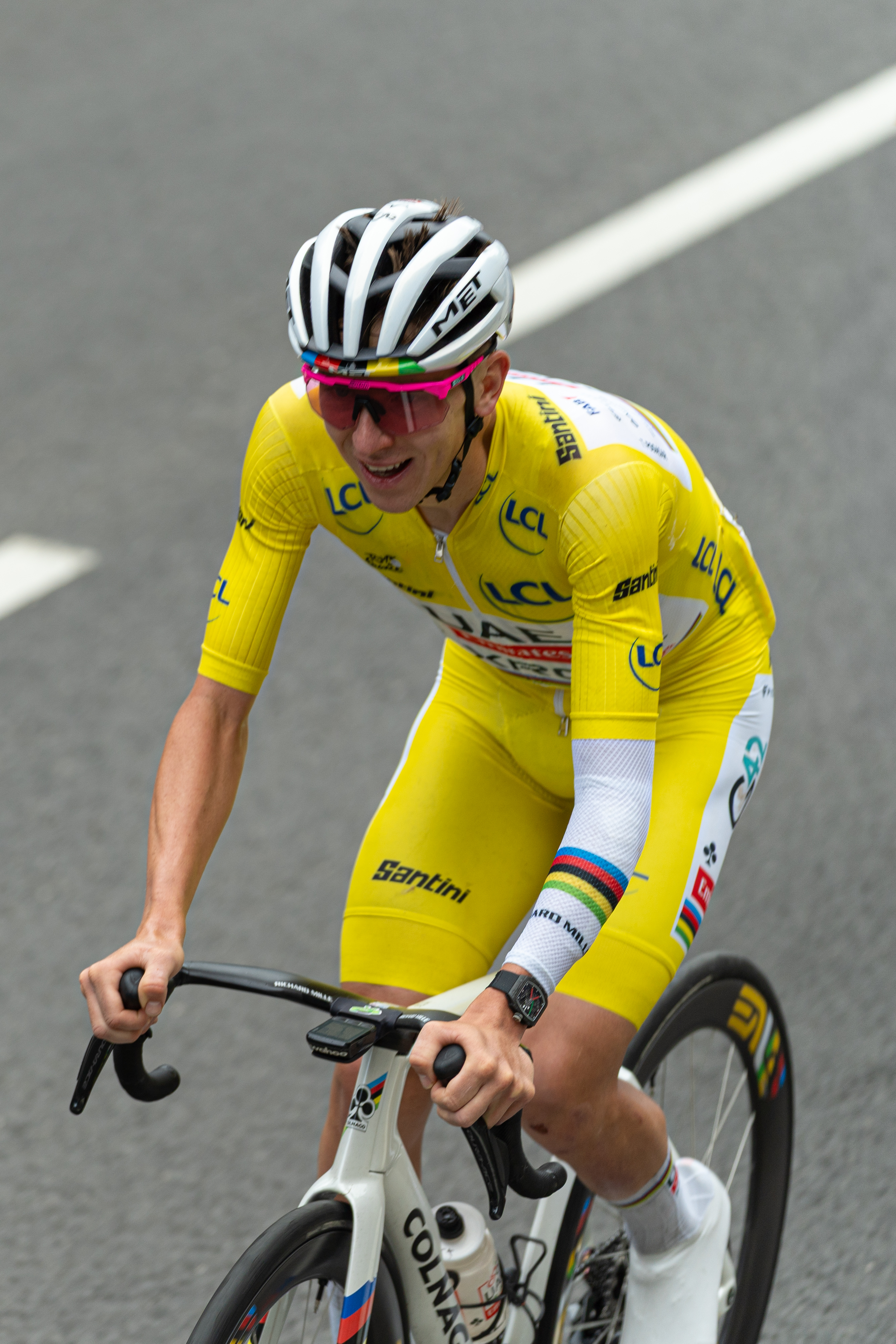
Tadej Pogačar wearing the yellow jersey in the 2025 Tour de France

The original yellow jerseys were of conventional style. Riders had to pull them over their head on the rostrum. For many years the jersey was made in only limited sizes and many riders found it a struggle to pull one on, especially when tired or wet. The presentation jersey is now made with a full-length zip at the back and the rider pulls it on from the front, sliding his hands through the sleeves. He then receives three further jerseys each day, plus money (referred to as the "rent") for each day he leads the race.

The yellow jersey on the first day of the Tour is traditionally permitted to be worn by the winner of the previous year's race; however, wearing it is a choice left to the rider, and in recent years has gone out of fashion. If the winner does not ride, the jersey is not worn. The previous year's winner traditionally has race number "1" (with his teammates given the other single-digit racing numbers), with subsequent sets of numbers determined by the highest classified riders for that team in the previous Tour. The lead riders for a particular team will often wear the first number in the series (11, 21, 31 and so forth), but these riders are not necessarily contenders for the general classification — teams led by sprinters will often designate the points classification contender as their lead rider.

There is no copyright on the yellow jersey and it has been imitated by many other races, although not always for the best rider overall: in the Tour of Benelux yellow is worn by the best young rider. In professional surf, the current male and female leaders of the World Surf League wear a yellow jersey on all the heats of a tour stop.

In American English it is sometimes referred to as the mellow johnny, a play on its French name maillot jaune, originally by Lance Armstrong, who wore it many times while riding in the 1999–2005 races. Armstrong also uses the name "Mellow Johnny" for his Texas-based bike shop. The Lance Armstrong Foundation donated a yellow jersey from the 2002 Tour de France to the National Museum of American History.

On 19 July 2019, on the occasion of the centenary, a plaque was unveiled on the scene of delivery of the first yellow jersey in Grenoble.

== Rules ==
The Tour de France, and other bicycle stage races, are decided by totalling the time each rider takes on the daily stages. Time can be added or subtracted from this total time as bonuses for winning individual stages or being first to the top of a climb or penalties for rule infractions. The rider with the lowest overall time at the end of each stage receives a ceremonial yellow jersey and the right to start the next stage of the Tour in the yellow jersey. The rider to receive the yellow jersey after the last stage in Paris is the overall winner of the Tour.

Similar leader's jerseys exist in other cycling races, but are not always yellow. The Tour of California used gold, the Giro d'Italia uses pink and the Tour Down Under uses an ochre-coloured jersey. Until 2009 the Vuelta a España used gold; since 2010 the leader's jersey is red.

== Exceptions ==
=== More than one rider leading the general classification ===
In the early years of the Tour de France the time was measured in minutes although cyclists were usually seconds apart, which meant several cyclists sometimes shared the same time. In 1914 this happened with the two leaders Philippe Thys and Jean Rossius.

After the introduction of the yellow jersey in 1919, the general classification leaders shared the same time twice. First in 1929 three riders had the same time when the race reached Bordeaux. Nicolas Frantz of Luxembourg and the Frenchmen Victor Fontan and André Leducq all rode in yellow for Stage 18. In 1931, Charles Pélissier and Rafaele di Paco led with the same time for Stage 6.

The organisers solved the problem of joint leaders by awarding the jersey to whichever rider had the best daily finishing places earlier in the race. The introduction of a short time trial at the start of the race in 1967 created distinctions down to a fraction of the second between riders' overall times, except for races which did not start with a time-trial, such as the 2008, 2011, 2013, and 2024 editions. According to the ASO rules,

"In the event of a tie in the general ranking [sic], the hundredth of a second recorded by the timekeepers during the individual time trial stages will be included in the total times in order to decide the overall winner and who takes the yellow jersey. If a tie should still result from this, then the places achieved for each stage are added up and, as a last resort, the place obtained in the final stage is counted."

=== No riders in yellow ===
Multiple riders who became race leader through the misfortune of others have ridden next day without the yellow jersey.

- In 1950, Ferdi Kubler of Switzerland rode in his national jersey rather than yellow when the race leader, Fiorenzo Magni abandoned the race along with the Italian team in protest at threats said to have been made by spectators.
- In 1971, Eddy Merckx declined the jersey after the previous leader, Luis Ocaña, crashed on the col de Mente in the Pyrenees.
- In 1980, Joop Zoetemelk did not wear the yellow jersey that passed to him when his rival, Bernard Hinault, retired with tendonitis.
- In 1991, Greg LeMond rode without the jersey after a crash eliminated Rolf Sørensen.
- In 2005, Lance Armstrong refused to start in the yellow jersey after the previous owner, David Zabriskie, was eliminated by a crash, but put it on after the neutral zone on request of the race organizers.
- In 2015, there was no yellow jersey in Stage 7 after Tony Martin crashed in the previous stage. Martin had finished the previous stage after the crash (and officially retained the yellow jersey as a result), but had broken his collarbone in the crash and did not start Stage 7. Chris Froome became the overall leader with Martin's non-start.

In 2007, there was neither a yellow jersey at the start of the race nor a number 1; the winner from the previous year, Floyd Landis of the United States, failed a doping control after the race, and organisers declined to declare an official winner pending arbitration of the Landis case. On September 20, 2007, Landis was officially stripped of his title following the arbitration court's guilty verdict, and the 2006 title passed to Óscar Pereiro. In 2008, the runner-up from the previous year, Cadel Evans, was given the race number "1" when the 2007 winner, Alberto Contador was unable to defend his title due to a dispute between the organisers ASO and his new team Astana barring that team from riding the Tour.

=== Doping violations ===
In 1978, the Belgian rider Michel Pollentier became race leader after attacking on the Alpe d'Huez. He was disqualified the same day after trying to cheat a drug test.

In 1988, Pedro Delgado of Spain won the Tour despite a drug test showing he had taken a drug that could be used to hide the use of steroids. News of the test was leaked to the press by the former organiser of the Tour Jacques Goddet. Delgado was allowed to continue because the drug, probenecid, was not banned by the Union Cycliste Internationale.

The 1996 winner Bjarne Riis revealed in 2007 that he used drugs during the 1996 race. He was asked to stay away from the 2007 Tour in his role as directeur sportif of the Danish Team CSC.

The 2006 winner Floyd Landis was disqualified more than a year after the race. After he failed a doping control test following his stunning Stage 17 victory, an arbitration panel declared him guilty of doping in September 2007; the official title for the 2006 Tour passed to Óscar Pereiro. Landis appealed his case to the Court of Arbitration for Sport, but lost this appeal at the end of June 2008 allowing Óscar Pereiro to start the 2008 edition of Le Tour de France as the unqualified 2006 Tour champion.

In 2007, the Danish rider Michael Rasmussen was withdrawn from the race by his team after complaints that he had not made himself available for drug tests earlier in the year. Rasmussen said that he was in Mexico, but there were reports that he was seen training in Italy. He later admitted doping for more than a decade.

Maurice Garin won the Tour de France before yellow jerseys were awarded; but in 1904, he was disqualified as winner after complaints that he and other riders cheated. The allegations disappeared with the Tour de France's other archives, when they were taken south in 1940 to avoid the German invasion. But a man, who knew Garin as a small boy, recalled that Garin admitted catching a train part of the way.

In 2012, Lance Armstrong was stripped of his seven Tour de France titles by UCI, following a report by the United States Anti-Doping Agency revealing that Armstrong had systematically used performance-enhancing drugs for much of his career, including all seven Tour victories.

== Record days in yellow ==
The rider who has most worn the yellow jersey is the Belgian Eddy Merckx, who wore it 96 days. Only five other riders have worn it more than 50 days: Bernard Hinault, Miguel Induráin, Chris Froome, Jacques Anquetil and Tadej Pogačar. Until his records were revoked in 2012 due to disqualification by reason of doping, Lance Armstrong was in 2nd with 83.

Greg LeMond won the tour three times, Laurent Fignon won it twice and Joop Zoetemelk won it once, each of them have spent 22 days in the race lead.

Among active riders Tadej Pogačar is in the lead with 71, Jonas Vingegaard has 27 and Julian Alaphilippe, 18.

The rider to wear the Jersey in the most tours is Hinault with 8, which was every Tour he entered. Merckx, Pogačar, André Darrigade and Fabian Cancellara wore it in 6 and Indurain, Anquetil and Zoetemelk wore it in 5 Tours.

The greatest number of riders to wear the jersey in a single edition of Le Tour de France is eight, which happened in 1958 and 1987.

== Refusal of synthetic materials ==
The yellow jersey was made for decades, like all other cycling jerseys, from wool. No synthetic fibres existed which had both the warmth and the absorption of wool. Embroidery was expensive and so the only lettering to appear on the jersey was the H.D. of Desgrange's initials. Riders added the name of the team for which they were riding or the professional team for which they normally rode (in the years when the Tour was for national rather than sponsored teams) by attaching a panel of printed cloth to the front of the jersey by pins.

While synthetic material did not exist in a way to create whole jerseys, synthetic thread or blends were added in 1947, following the arrival of Sofil as a sponsor. Sofil made artificial yarn. Riders, especially the Frenchman Louison Bobet (Louis Bobet as he was still known), believed in the pureness of wool. Bobet insisted that cyclists needed wool for their long days of sweating in the heat and dust. It was a matter of hygiene. Artificial fabrics made riders sweat too much. And, in his first Tour de France, he refused to wear the jersey with which he had been presented.

Goddet recalled:

"It produced a real drama. Our contract with Sofil was crumbling away. If the news had got out, the commercial effect would have been disastrous for the manufacturer. I remember debating it with him a good part of the night. Louison was always exquisitely courteous but his principles were as hard as the granite blocks of his native Brittany coast."

== "Elegance in yellow" ==
Writer and television broadcaster Jean-Paul Ollivier described the woolen yellow as follows:

"...gave the riders a rare elegance, even if the way it caught the air left something to be desired. In wool, then in Rhovyl — a material used for making underwear — it entered into legend for the quality of those who wore it. Those were the years of national teams. In 1930 Henri Desgrange, the organiser, decided that commercially-sponsored teams were contriving to spoil his race and opted instead for teams representing countries. The Tour de France stayed that way until 1962, when it reverted to commercial teams with the exception of 1967 and 1968 and the riders knotted on their jerseys a spare tyre [across the shoulders] A narrow slip of white cotton placed on the chest showed discreetly the name of the sponsor outside the Tour: La Perle, Mercier, Helyett..."

The advent of printing by flocking, a process in which cotton fluff is sprayed on to stencilled glue, and then of screen printing, combined with the domination of synthetic materials to increase the advertising on jerseys: the domination which Ollivier regrets. "All sorts of fantasies such as fluorescent jerseys or shorts", he said. Such was the quantity of advertising when Bernard Thévenet accepted the yellow jersey when the Tour finished for the first time on the Champs-Élysées in 1975 that the French sports minister counted all the logos and protested to broadcasters. Since then the number of people with access to the podium has been restricted.

== Sponsorship ==
The French bank Crédit Lyonnais has sponsored the maillot jaune since 1987. The company has been a commercial partner of the Tour since 1981. It awards a toy lion - le lion en peluche - to each day's winner as a play on its name. In 2007, sponsorship of the jersey was credited to LCL, the new name for Crédit Lyonnais following its takeover by another bank, Crédit Agricole.

The jersey has been produced by a variety of manufacturers – Nike from 1996 to 2011, Le Coq Sportif from 2012 to 2021 and Santini from 2022-2026. In 2027 Castelli would be the manufacturer sponsor.

== See also ==
- List of Tour de France general classification winners
- Yellow jersey statistics
