= 1917 Paris–Tours =

Race details
- Dates: 6 May 1917
- Stages: 1
- Distance: 246 km (152.9 mi)
- Winning time: 7h 14' 00"

Results
	Winner	Philippe Thys (BEL)
	Second	Marcel Godivier (FRA)
	Third	Eugene Christophe (FRA)

The 1917 Paris–Tours was the 12th edition of the Paris–Tours cycle race and was held on 6 May 1917. The race started in Paris and finished in Tours. The race was won by Philippe Thys.

== General classification ==
Final general classification

Rank	Rider	Time
1	Philippe Thys (BEL)	7h 14' 00"
2	Marcel Godivier (FRA)	+ 2' 00"
3	Eugène Christophe (FRA)	+ 8' 00"
4	Charles Mantelet (FRA)	+ 29' 00"
5	Félix Douarin (FRA)	+ 30' 00"
6	Charles Juseret (BEL)	+ 31' 00"
7	René Vandenhove (FRA)	+ 34' 00"
8	André Noel (FRA)	+ 47' 00"
9	Ali Neffati (TUN)	+ 47' 00"
10	Lucien Cazalis (SUI)	+ 1h 00' 00"
