= Charles Snell =

Australian cyclist

Personal information
- Full name: Charles Snell
- Born: 10 January 1888 Kialla West, Victoria, Australia
- Died: 1 April 1977 (aged 89) Foster, Victoria, Australia

Cycling career
- Sport: Cycling
- Role: Rider
- Rider type: Long-Distance Road Race

Professional team
- 1914: Cycles Gladiator

Major wins
- Barnet Glass Road Race from Bendigo to Melbourne 1911

Charles Snell (10 January 1888 – 1 April 1977) was an Australian racing cyclist who was a member of the first team of Australians that was to take part in the 1914 Tour de France.

== Biography ==
Snell's cycling career started in 1909 when he participated as a courier in the Dunlop Relay Despatch Ride from Adelaide to Sydney, racing close to his hometown from Balmattum to Baddaginnie. After taking his career more seriously the next season, he went on to his first success in 1911, winning blue ribbon (fastest time) in the Barnet Glass Road Race from Bendigo to Melbourne.

In 1914, Snell, together with Iddo "Snowy" Munro, Don Kirkham, Charlie Piercey and George Bell, became part of the first team of Australian Cyclists to head off for racing in Europe, with the objective to be competing in the Tour de France. Initially, the team rode as professionals for the Paris-based Gladiator Cycles & Clement Tyre team, competing in classic races like Milan–San Remo., Paris–Roubaix, Paris-Bruxelles, Paris-Nancy, and the Tour of Belgium. Eventually, only Munro and Kirkham were selected for participation in the Tour de France

After the Tour de France, Snell returned to Australia; in early August 1914 he left for Melbourne with Don Kirkham and George Bell. He continued to race in Australia until the mid 1920s. His younger brother, John George, was active in road racing as well.
