= 1908 Liège–Bastogne–Liège =

Race details
- Dates: 30 August 1908
- Stages: 1
- Distance: 235 km (146 mi)
- Winning time: 8h 12' 09"

Results
	Winner	André Trousselier (FRA)
	Second	Alfons Lauwers (BEL)
	Third	Henri Dubois (BEL)

The 1908 Liège–Bastogne–Liège was the fourth edition of the Liège–Bastogne–Liège cycle race and was held on 30 August 1908. The race started and finished in Liège. The race was won by André Trousselier.

== General classification ==
Final general classification

Rank	Rider	Time
1	André Trousselier (FRA)	8h 12' 09"
2	Alfons Lauwers (BEL)	+ 0"
3	Henri Dubois (BEL)	+ 0"
4	René Van Den Berghe (BEL)	+ 0"
5	Georges Verbist (BEL)	+ 0"
6	François d'Haen (BEL)	+ 0"
7	Edmond Lasson (BEL)	+ 0"
8	L. Theralle (BEL)	+ 0"
9	Léo Kops (BEL)	+ 0"
10	A. Bettens (BEL)	+ 0"
