= 1917 Giro di Lombardia =

Race details
- Dates: 4 November 1917
- Stages: 1
- Distance: 204 km (126.8 mi)
- Winning time: 6h 58' 02"

Results
	Winner	Philippe Thys (BEL)
	Second	Henri Pélissier (FRA)
	Third	Leopoldo Torricelli (ITA)

The 1917 Giro di Lombardia was the 13th edition of the Giro di Lombardia cycle race and was held on 4 November 1917. The race started and finished in Milan. The race was won by Philippe Thys of the Peugeot team.

== General classification ==
Final general classification

Rank	Rider	Team	Time
1	Philippe Thys (BEL)	Peugeot–Wolber	6h 58' 02"
2	Henri Pélissier (FRA)		+ 0"
3	Leopoldo Torricelli (ITA)	Maino	+ 0"
4	Luigi Lucotti (ITA)	Bianchi	+ 0"
5	Charles Juseret (BEL)		+ 0"
6	Gaetano Belloni (ITA)	Bianchi	+ 3' 25"
7	Angelo Gremo (ITA)	Bianchi	+ 3' 25"
8	Romeo Poid (ITA)		+ 3' 25"
9	Alfredo Sivocci (ITA)	Dei	+ 3' 25"
10	Costante Girardengo (ITA)	Bianchi	+ 15' 00"
