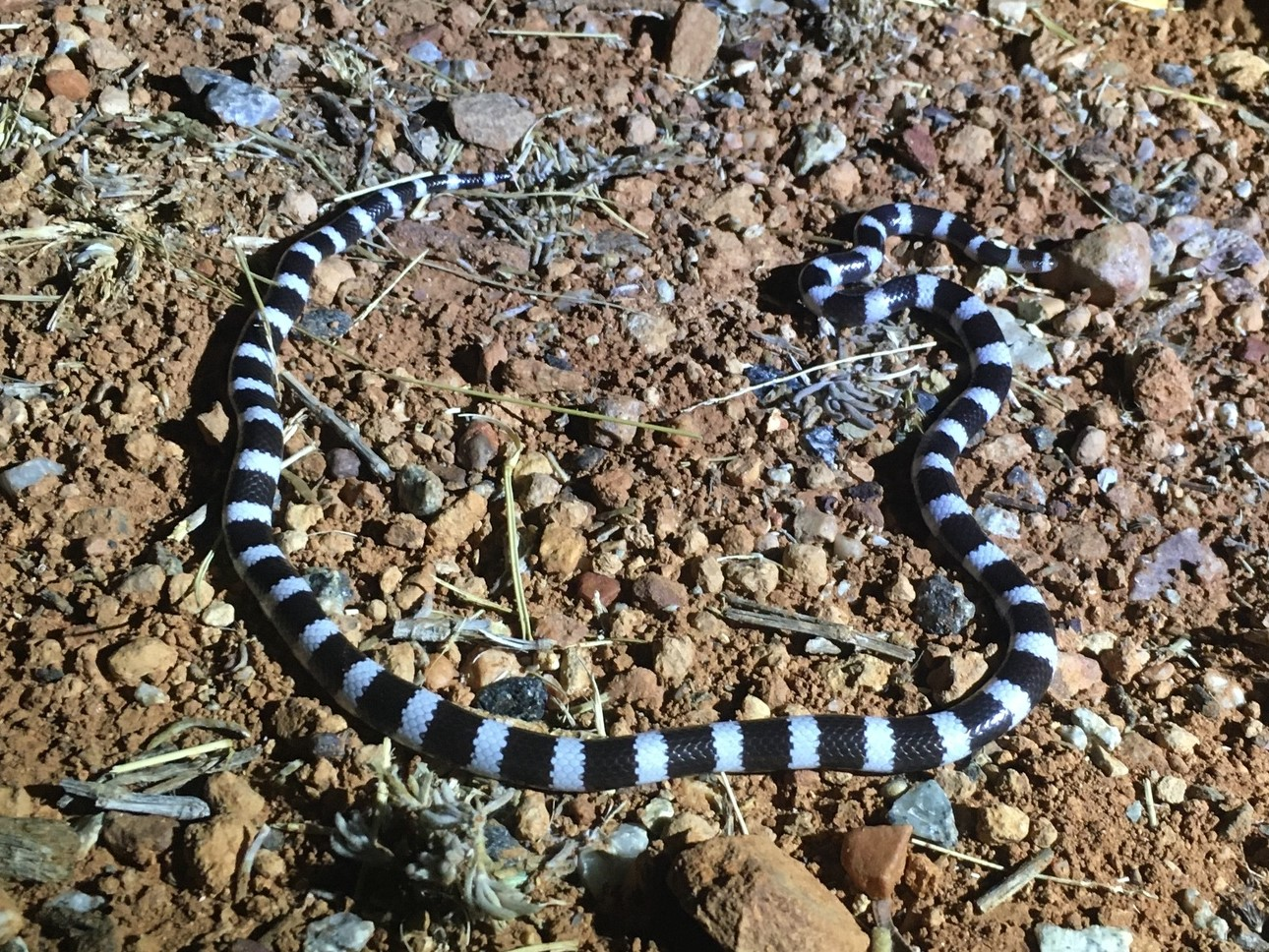

Conservation status
- Least Concern (IUCN 3.1)

Scientific classification
- Kingdom: Animalia
- Phylum: Chordata
- Class: Reptilia
- Order: Squamata
- Suborder: Serpentes
- Family: Elapidae
- Genus: Vermicella
- Species: V. vermiformis

Binomial name
- Vermicella vermiformis Keogh & Smith, 1996

= Vermicella vermiformis =

Species of snake

Vermicella vermiformis, commonly known as the Centralian bandy-bandy, is a species of snake in the family Elapidae.

It is endemic to Australia.

== Distribution and habitat ==
It is found in the Northern Territory.
