= 1918 Paris–Tours =

Race details
- Dates: 19 May 1918
- Stages: 1
- Distance: 246 km (152.9 mi)
- Winning time: 8h 13' 00"

Results
	Winner	Charles Mantelet (FRA)
	Second	Lucien Cazalis (SUI)
	Third	Alexis Michiels (BEL)

The 1918 Paris–Tours was the 13th edition of the Paris–Tours cycle race and was held on 19 May 1918. The race started in Paris and finished in Tours. The race was won by Charles Mantelet.

== General classification ==
Final general classification

Rank	Rider	Time
1	Charles Mantelet (FRA)	8h 13' 00"
2	Lucien Cazalis (SUI)	+ 0"
3	Alexis Michiels (BEL)	+ 3' 09"
4	Armand Lemee (FRA)	+ 3' 09"
5	Charles Kippert (FRA)	+ 3' 09"
6	Paul Duboc (FRA)	+ 3' 09"
7	Georges Pasche (SUI)	+ 3' 09"
8	René Chassot (FRA)	+ 9' 00"
9	Ali Neffati (TUN)	+ 27' 10"
10	Lucien Pattey (SUI)	+ 27' 10"
