= Intermediate bandy bandy =

Conservation status
- Least Concern (IUCN 3.1)

Scientific classification
- Kingdom: Animalia
- Phylum: Chordata
- Class: Reptilia
- Order: Squamata
- Suborder: Serpentes
- Family: Elapidae
- Genus: Vermicella
- Species: V. intermedia

Binomial name
- Vermicella intermedia Keogh & Smith, 1996

Species of snake

The intermediate bandy-bandy (Vermicella intermedia) is a species of snake in the family Elapidae.

It is endemic to Australia.

== Habitat and distribution ==
The snakes are found in Western Australia and the Northern Territory.
