= 1914 Milan–San Remo =

Race details
- Dates: 5 April 1914
- Stages: 1
- Distance: 286.5 km (178.0 mi)
- Winning time: 10h 32' 32"

Results
	Winner	Ugo Agostoni (ITA)
	Second	Carlo Galetti (ITA)
	Third	Charles Crupelandt (FRA)

The 1914 Milan–San Remo was the eighth edition of the Milan–San Remo cycle race and was held on 5 April 1914. The race started in Milan and finished in San Remo. The race was won by Ugo Agostoni.

== General classification ==
Final general classification

Rank	Rider	Time
1	Ugo Agostoni (ITA)	10h 32' 32"
2	Carlo Galetti (ITA)	+ 0"
3	Charles Crupelandt (FRA)	+ 0"
4	Jean Alavoine (FRA)	+ 0"
5	Giuseppe Santha (ITA)	+ 0"
6	Luigi Ganna (ITA)	+ 0"
7	Luigi Lucotti (ITA)	+ 0"
8	Vincenzo Borgarello (ITA)	+ 0"
9	Don Kirkham (AUS)	+ 0"
10	Alfonso Calzolari (ITA)	+ 0"
