= Charles Mantelet =

French bicycle racer

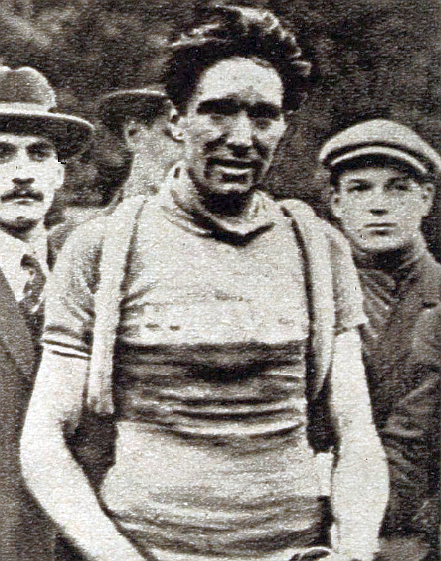
- Mantelet in 1923

Personal information
- Born: 10 November 1894 Paris, France
- Died: 2 May 1955 (aged 60) Paris, France

Cycling career
- Sport: Cycling
- Discipline: Road
- Role: Rider

Professional teams
- 1923: Manola–Vallet
- 1927–1928: Mifa
- 1927–1928: Brennabor

Charles Mantelet (10 November 1894 – 2 May 1955) was a French cyclist who won Paris–Tours in 1918.

== Major results ==
1913
2nd Paris–Évreux
1914
1st Paris–Évreux
1917
4th Paris–Tours
1918
1st Paris–Tours
1921
2nd Circuit de Champagne
1923
2nd Circuit de Paris
