= Vermicella parscauda =

Scientific classification
- Kingdom: Animalia
- Phylum: Chordata
- Class: Reptilia
- Order: Squamata
- Suborder: Serpentes
- Family: Elapidae
- Genus: Vermicella
- Species: V. parscauda

Binomial name
- Vermicella parscauda Derez et al., 2018

Species of snake

The Weipa bandy bandy (Vermicella parscauda) is a species of snake in the family Elapidae, described in 2018.

It is endemic to Australia.

== Taxonomy ==
The species name is from Latin pars (part) and cauda (tail), after the tail length and the formed bands on the tail.

== Description ==
The snake has 55–94 black dorsal bands and mottled or black ventral scales terminating approximately 2/3rds of the body into formed black rings.

== Habitat and distribution ==
It is found in the Weipa area, Cape York, in Queensland. It inhabits monsoon habitat.

== Conservation ==
The species has a confined locality and seems to be rare based on the lack of specimens. This coupled with potential habitat disruption due to mining suggests that this species may be threatened and need conservation.
