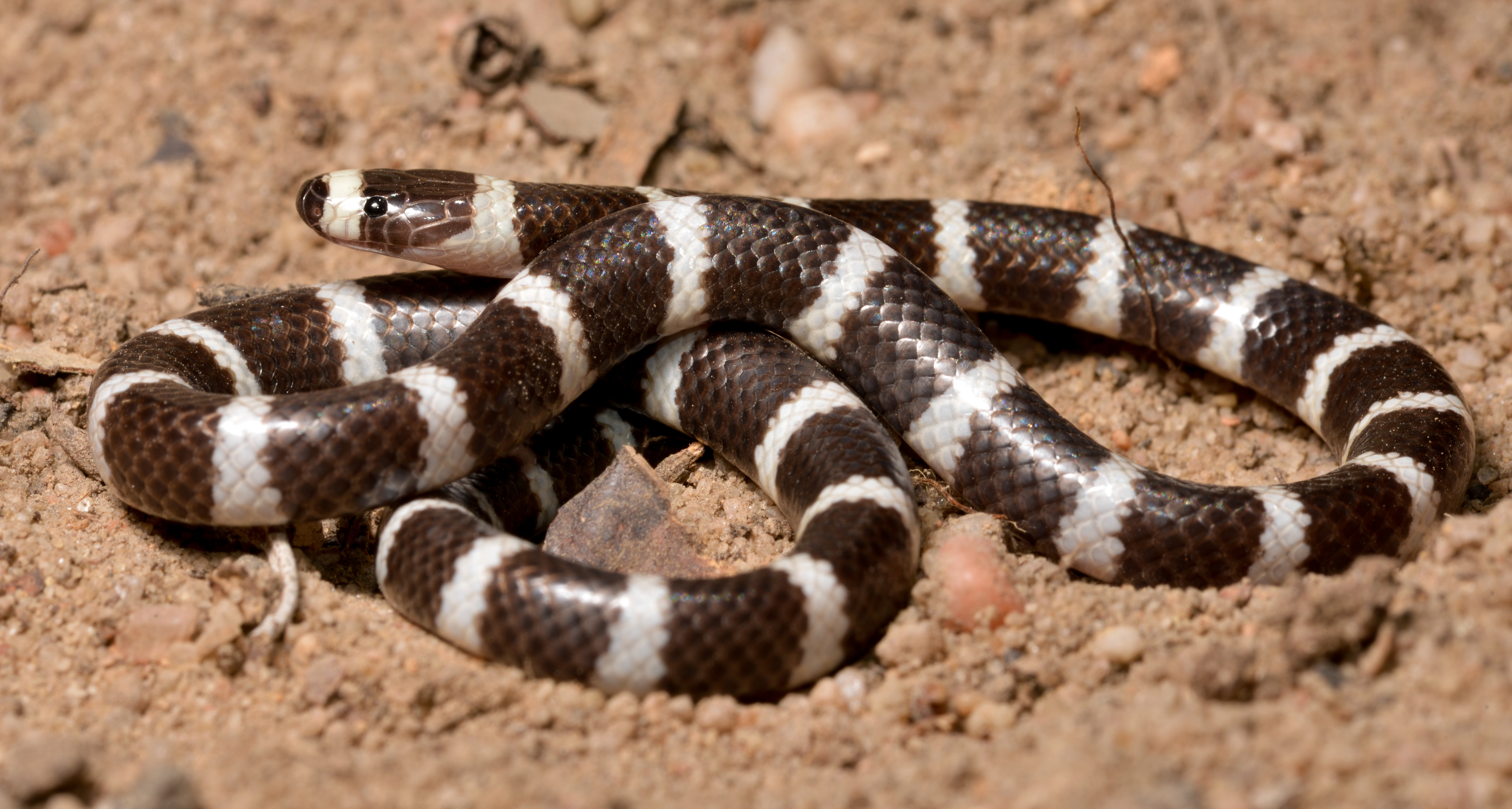

Scientific classification
- Kingdom: Animalia
- Phylum: Chordata
- Class: Reptilia
- Order: Squamata
- Suborder: Serpentes
- Family: Elapidae
- Genus: Vermicella
- Species: V. annulata

Binomial name
- Vermicella annulata (Gray, 1841)

Synonyms
- Calamaria annulata Gray, 1841; Elaps occipitalis A.M.C. Duméril, Bibron & A.H.A. Duméril, 1854; Vermicella lunulata Krefft, 1869; Furina occipitalis — Boulenger, 1896; Rhynchelaps latizonatus DeVis, 1905

= Bandy-bandy =

Species of snake

The bandy-bandy (Vermicella annulata), also commonly known as the hoop snake, is a species of venomous snake in the family Elapidae. The word bandy-bandy (bandi-bandi) traces back to the indigenous dialect of Kattang, from the Taree region, New South Wales. There are 5 known species of bandy-bandy, all of which are endemic to Australia.

== Description ==
The bandy-bandy is a smooth-scaled, glossy snake with a distinctive pattern of sharply contrasting black and white rings that continue right around the body. Bandy-bandys are strikingly distinguishable from other Australian land snakes by their unique banding pattern, which gives the species both its common names and its scientific name (from the diminutive form, annul-, of the Latin anus, meaning "ring"). Their tail is relatively short, having fewer than 35 subcaudals and the tip is blunt, unlike other elapids. The dorsal scales are in 15 rows at mid body. The average total length (including tail) is 50 to 60 cm (20 to 24 in), but size is highly variable between sexes.

== Taxonomy ==
The family Elapidae is distinguished from other snake families by their proteroglyphous dentition. They have at least one pair of fangs that are hollow and fixed i.e. immobile at the front of the mouth, specifically located on the rostral area of the maxillae. This fang structure is designed to deliver toxins, which is why elapid snakes around the world are notoriously known as the most venomous. More specifically, Australian proteroglyphs can be distinguished from other proteroglyphs by the movement of the palatine bone when swallowing. The movement is referred to as "palatine dragging", as opposed to "palatine erecting" that occurs in other proteroglyphs around the world.

The taxonomic history of the bandy-bandy has involved many re-arrangements. Until 1996, there were thought to be only three species of Vermicella, which were subjectively arranged multiple times into different specific and subspecific categories based on morphological characteristics. However, after an extensive analysis of morphological and geographical characteristics of 425 museum specimens, the three existing taxa were listed as separate species and two new species were identified. Though since 2018, the discovery of another species (V. parscauda) on a peninsula in Australia's far north indicates more species of bandy-bandys may exist. Through morphological and mitochondrial DNA analysis, it was found that V.parscauda was most related to the northern-dwelling bandy-bandys V.intermedia and V.multifasciata. All three of these species occupy tropical monsoon habitats.

The six known species of bandy-bandy are allopatric i.e. their geographical distributions do not overlap with one another, with a few exceptions. Generally, the way to identify a species of Vermicella is by the location of where it is found. However, there exists some overlap in geographical distribution between V.intermedia and V.multifasciata, V.annulata and V.parscauda and V.annulata and V.vermiformis based on previous sightings of specimens. Therefore, three morphological characteristics have been listed as determinants of each species: (1) Internasals present/absent. For bandy-bandys, the internasal scales are a pair of scales that occur between the nasal scales on the head, directly before the rostral scale. This internasal pair is either present or absent in species of Vermicella; (2) Number of black bands on the body and tail combined; (3) Number of ventral scales. The ventral scales are elongated, horizontal scales that occur on the belly of the snake up until the anal plate. After the anal plate, the scales are subcaudal scales.

=== Eastern bandy-bandy (Vermicella annulata) ===
The most common of bandy-bandys, occurring throughout northern and eastern Australia. Found in a variety of habitats such as wet coastal forests, Acacia, mulga and mallee scrubs, savannah woodland and spinifex desert sandhills. Internasals present; commonly less than 260 ventral scales.

=== Wide-banded northern bandy-bandy (Vermicella intermedia) ===
Distributed in a band across North-western NT and far northern WA. Found in Eucalyptus forests and dry woodlands. Internasals absent; Less than 75 black bands total on the body and tail.

=== Northern bandy-bandy (Vermicella multifasciata) ===
A patchy distribution in north-western NT and far northern WA. Found in Eucalyptus forests and dry woodlands. Internasals absent; More than 75 black blands total on the body and tail.

=== Pilbara bandy-bandy (Vermicella snelli) ===
Only located in the Pilbara region, WA. Found in all habitats of its distribution, such as scrubs, grasslands and stony ranges. Internasals present; usually more than 285 ventral scales.

=== Worm-like bandy-bandy (Vermicella vermiformis) ===
Only two separate areas of distribution in Australia: one in central Australia and one in southern Arnhem Land, NT. The northern population is found in dry woodlands and Eucalyptus forests, whereas the southern population is found in scrubs and stony ranges. Internasals present; Usually up to 285 ventral scales.

=== Weipa bandy-bandy (Vermicella parscauda) ===
A new species determined by Associate Professor Brian Fry from the University of Queensland in 2018. Specimens found only in the Weipa area, Cape York, QLD. Found in Eucalyptus forests and dry woodlands. Internasals present; ventral scales ranging from 213 - 230. White banding tends to be incomplete around the body and forms an indistinct boundary with black banding. The first specimen was found on a boat ramp, only a few hundred metres away from a bauxite mine. A total of five specimens have been found. Unfortunately, suitable habitat for the newly discovered V.parscauda has been cleared for the mining site, threatening this species as well as others such as the palm cockatoo, who rely on old tree hollows as habitat.

== Venom ==
Elapids carry neurotoxins in their venom that can be notoriously deadly to humans. Different species of elapids carry varying molecular compositions of neurotoxins, adapted to suit their diet. However, neurotoxins in Australian elapid snakes are subject to mutagenesis, which is thought to not only be adaptable to different prey types and potency, but to be a means of preventing venom resistance in prey. V. annulata is weakly venomous with localised symptoms around the bite area. It is generally considered harmless due to the small size of its mouth and its inoffensive nature.

== Distribution and habitat ==
Bandy-bandys occupy a large variety of habitats from desert regions to wet rainforest. Their distribution especially V.annulata spans across the east coast of Australia, whilst other species occupy far northern Australia and arid regions of western and central Australia.

The bandy-bandy is found mainly in suburbs with woodland habitats such as Mt Cotton, Mt Crosby, Kholo, Brisbane, and Lockyer Valley. It is most common in areas of remnant habitat structure such as the foothills of Mt Glorious and Brisbane Forest Park. It has also been found at Cannonvale in the Whitsundays region of North Queensland, in late 2019 in the Coffs Harbour region, and in late 2021 north of Murwillumbah in the Far North Coast region of New South Wales. In Southeast Queensland, it is found across a wide range of habitats and vegetation types, from coastal forest and woodland, to scrubland, mulga, and outback desert. It is found also in central New South Wales (Dubbo/Parkes) and Lower North Coast NSW (Pacific Palms/Hunter Valley).
The bandy-bandy has also been spotted in the White Rock and Spring Mountain Conservation Park near Ipswich, Queensland. The bandy-bandy is also found in the south-eastern side of South Australia.

== Reproduction ==
The bandy-bandy is oviparous i.e. produces offspring within eggs that are hatched after birth. Females seasonally produce offspring, laying eggs in the late summer (February - March) after undergoing vitellogenesis in October. Both live-bearing and oviparous Australian elapid snakes follow a similar seasonal reproductive cycle. Live-bearing elapids undergoing ovulation in October - December and give birth in February - April after a 14 week gestation period. Oviparous elapids undergo ovulation at the same time (October - December), where the eggs are then laid shortly after without the need of a gestation period. Newly hatched young only emerge at the same time as live-bearing snakes give birth (February - March). However, evidence exists that oviparous elapids may be able to produce a second clutch of eggs in the late summer, whereby newly hatched offspring emerge around April. The size of a clutch of V.annulata averages at 7.7 offspring, but up to 13 offspring have been recorded in a single clutch. Sexual dimorphism is evident in bandy-bandys, where females are much larger in size compared to males. In one study, female V.annulata had a mean snout-vent length of 54.4 cm compared to 39.2 cm in males. In many reptiles, the size of the clutch is dependent on the size of the mother. The advantages associated with a higher fecundity may create a selective pressure on female snakes to be larger, but the increase in clutch size based on maternal size and intensity of this selection is species-dependent. In relation to the bandy-bandy, larger maternal size is suggested to be caused by a selective pressure on fecundity. Male-male combat is highly documented and prevalent in many animals as a means of sexual selection, creating a selective pressure on males to be larger. In an analysis on snakes, male size relative to the female was larger in snake species where male-male combat occurred. However, male-male combat is absent in bandy-bandys and thus the size of males are relatively small.

== Diet ==
The bandy-bandy is ophiophagous i.e. eats snakes. Despite covering a large distribution across Australia, their diets consist mostly, if not solely of blind snakes from the family Typhlopidae. This family of blind snakes are common throughout Australia and thus are palatable for all six species of Vermicella. A previous examination of the stomach contents of 276 preserved specimens found that only three contained evidence of prey in their stomachs, all existing from the genus Ramphotyphlops (family Typhlopidae). In addition, two bandy-bandys in captivity refused to eat a white-lipped snake Drysdalia coronoides, a three-toed earless skink Hemiergis decresiensis, and a delicate skink Lampropholis delicata. However, one bandy-bandy ate a blackish blind snake Ramphotyphlops nigrescens, confirming the prey specificity of the bandy-bandy to be Typhlopidae. However, the possibility remains that other burrowing animals such as skinks may be a rare part of their diet. Apart from their front fangs, bandy-bandys only possess a few small teeth behind these fangs, thought to be an adaptation to feeding on blind snakes.

Snakes locate prey through the sampling of chemical cues that are collected via tongue flicking. The chemosensory responsiveness for certain chemical cues differs depending on the specialised prey of that snake. Even for snakes that are prey generalists, chemical responsiveness changes geographically based on local availabilities of prey types. Since the diet of the bandy-bandy is specific to blind snakes, they are highly responsive to the chemical cues left by blind snakes. A study found that bandy-bandys were able to follow blind snake chemical trails for an average of 0.93 metres, while some specimens were able to follow the chemical trail to its completion, 1.4 metres long. To confirm the specificity in their chemosensory response, they were unresponsive to the chemical trails of other reptiles such as the yellow-bellied three-toed skink Saiphos equalis and the golden crowned snake Cacophis squamulosus. Blind snakes are large in comparison to the bandy-bandy, in some cases larger than the bandy-bandy itself. They have been seen with prey protruding a few centimetres out of their mouth while they slowly digest the blind snake. As a consequence of their large prey items, bandy-bandy's have a much lower feeding rate than other elapids, whereby only 1.1% of captured specimens contained prey items, compared to the average of 20.3% in other elapids.

== Behavior ==
A nocturnal, burrowing snake, V. annulata is found beneath the soil surface, under stumps, rocks, and logs. It emerges at night to forage, especially after rain or during warmer and humid weather.

=== Defence ===
The bandy-bandy has multiple predators including owls, larger reptiles, feral cats and foxes. With a striking colouration pattern, this snake is not adapted to camouflage on a forest floor. When confronted by a potential predator, the bandy-bandy has multiple tactics to instigate either a fight or flight response.

A regular banded pattern in snakes can create a phenomenon of ‘flicker fusion’, which acts to cause an illusion during flight. Since bandy-bandys are nocturnal, they can effective execute this illusion by moving fast in dim light. The 'flicker fusion' effect only works to confuse predators if its frequency exceeds that of the predators' critical fusion frequencies (CFFs) in their eyes. Bandy-bandys can exceed this effect higher than most vertebrates' CFFs and thus causes a great confusion to predators.

A banded pattern in is also likely to be a disruptive colouration to a predator. Aposematism is a symbiotically evolved way of honestly warning predators of poisonous or venomous defences using bright colouration. This phenomenon is prevalent in a plethora of species throughout the animal kingdom. The bandy-bandy is mildly venomous and may partially use its colouration as a threat to its predators, if they were to attack it. However, the fight-response of the bandy-bandy not only involves the snake's colouration, but involves an impressive defensive stance. The bandy-bandy, especially V.annulata, has a unique defensive display behaviour, where it contorts its body into one or multiple loops that reach a vertical height of 15 cm. Its head and tail maintains on ground level, facing its tail towards the perceived threat and the head the farthest from its perceived threat, shielded by the vertical loops. This defensive display is extremely menacing and conspicuous, especially to reptile predators that are low to the ground. By displaying height and colouration and by hiding its head behind its defensive loops, the bandy-bandy can leave potential predators both confused and intimidated.

=== Around the home ===
The bandy-bandy is infrequently encountered. Occasionally, a specimen is discovered by a roaming cat at night or often found after falling into a backyard swimming pool. It prefers subterranean refugia under large rocks or deeply set ground timber.

== Related species discovery ==
In 2018, a new member of the bandy-bandy snake genus was discovered, and named V. parscauda. The new species was found by Dutch biologist Freek Vonk at Weipa on Cape York Peninsula, near Rio Tinto's bauxite mining operations, and may be endangered.
