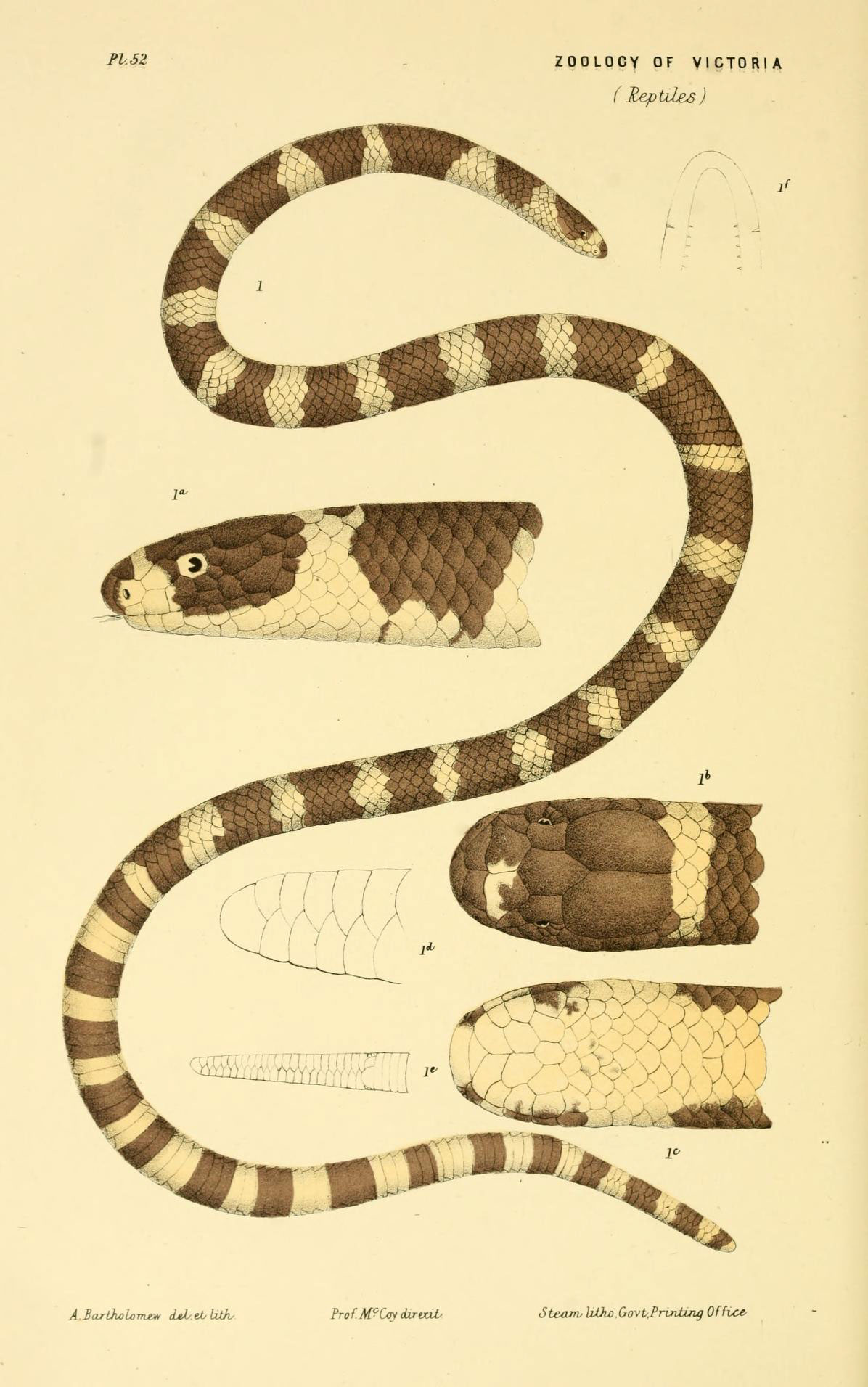
- Vermicella annulata

Scientific classification
- Kingdom: Animalia
- Phylum: Chordata
- Class: Reptilia
- Order: Squamata
- Suborder: Serpentes
- Family: Elapidae
- Subfamily: Hydrophiinae
- Genus: Vermicella; Gray in Günther, 1858

= Vermicella =

Genus of snakes

Vermicella is a genus of venomous snakes of the family Elapidae, commonly known as bandy-bandies or hoop snakes. The best known species is the bandy-bandy (V. annulata).

== Species ==
Six species are recognized as being valid. In mid 2018 a new species of bandy-bandy was discovered in Australia, visually nearly identical to Vermicella annulata. The species named Vermicella parscauda is considerably more venomous, with a toxin that is comparable to that of the red-bellied black snake (Pseudechis porphyriacus).

- Vermicella annulata (Gray, 1841) – bandy-bandy
1. One species of Vermicella is the Bandy-Bandy commonly found in Australia. This snake is highly venomous and relatively small, sizing between 50 and 100 cm. Bandy-Bandies use their banded black and white pattern to repel predators by moving rapidly, causing a flicker visual illusion.
- Vermicella intermedia Keogh & S.A. Smith, 1996 – intermediate bandy-bandy
- Vermicella multifasciata (Longman, 1915) – northern bandy-bandy
- Vermicella snelli Storr, 1968 – Pilbara bandy-bandy
- Vermicella vermiformis Keogh & S.A. Smith, 1996 – Centralian bandy-bandy
- Vermicella parscauda Derez et al., 2018 – Weipa bandy-bandy.

Nota bene: A binomial authority in parentheses indicates that the species was originally described in a genus other than Vermicella.
