= 1914 Paris–Tours =

Race details
- Dates: 19 April 1914
- Stages: 1
- Distance: 316 km (196 mi)
- Winning time: 9h 49' 47"

Results
	Winner	Oscar Egg (SUI)
	Second	Émile Engel (FRA)
	Third	Philippe Thys (BEL)

The 1914 Paris–Tours was the 11th edition of the Paris–Tours cycle race and was held on 19 April 1914. The race started in Paris and finished in Tours. The race was won by Oscar Egg.

== General classification ==
Final general classification

Rank	Rider	Time
1	Oscar Egg (SUI)	9h 49' 47"
2	Émile Engel (FRA)	+ 0"
3	Philippe Thys (BEL)	+ 0"
4	Henri Devroye (BEL)	+ 0"
5	Hubert Noel (BEL)	+ 0"
6	Émile Georget (FRA)	+ 0"
7	Émile Masson (BEL)	+ 0"
8	Sadi Bricout (FRA)	+ 0"
9	Hector Tiberghien (BEL)	+ 0"
10	René Vandenberghe (BEL)	+ 0"
