= Auguste Trousselier =

French footballer

Personal information
- Date of birth: c. 1890
- Place of birth: 2nd arrondissement of Paris, France
- Position: Forward

Senior career*
Years	Team	Apps	(Gls)
1910–1911	Racing Club de France		
1911–1914	CASG Paris		

International career
1912	France (UIAFA)	1	(2)
1913	Northern France	+1	(0)
- * Club domestic league appearances and goals

Auguste Trousselier was a French footballer who played as a forward for CASG Paris and France (UIAFA) in the early 1910s.

He was the brother of André, a fellow footballer, and Louis, winner of the 1905 Tour de France.

== Playing career ==
Born in the 2nd arrondissement of Paris, Trousselier began his football career at his hometown club Racing Club de France in the early 1910s. On 30 April 1911, he started in the final of the 1911 USFSA Football Championship in Marseille, where one of his shots resulted in his side's opening goal in an eventual 2–3 loss to Stade Helvétique de Marseille, a team made-up of English and Swiss emigrants; after the match, the French journalist Robert Desmarets wrote on L'Auto (the future L'Équipe) that "Trousselier was the most courageous of the attack".

On 20 February 1912, Trousselier was playing for CASG Paris when he earned his first (and only) unofficial cap for France (UIAFA), a friendly match against Catalonia, scoring twice to help his side to a 7–0 victory; however, Desmarets expressed disappointed over his game, attributing it "to the emotion inherent in any international debut. He is thus one of the top scorers of UIAFA's France with two goals, alongside René Bagnol, Carlos Bacrot, and club teammate Albert Eloy.

In 1913, the USFSA selected Trousselier to play for the so-called Lions des Flandres, a regional scratch team representing Northern France, in a friendly match against the English Wanderers on 1 November, which ended in a 1–4 loss.

== Later life ==
During the First World War, Trousselier was taken prisoner.

== Honours ==
Racing Club de France

- USFSA Football Championship:
  - Runner-up (1): 1911
