= Don Kirkham (cyclist) =

Australian racing cyclist (1887–1930)

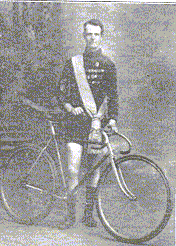

Personal information
- Full name: Duncan Kirkham
- Born: 23 July 1887 Lyndhurst, VIC
- Died: 30 April 1930 (aged 42) St Arnaud, Vic

Cycling career
- Sport: Cycling
- Role: Rider

Duncan "Don" Kirkham (23 July 1887 - 30 April 1930) was an Australian racing cyclist. Kirkham was a regular competitor in Australian long distance cycling races. He won the Goulburn to Sydney Classic in 1910, riding off scratch and setting the fastest time. In 1911 he was 2nd and set the fastest time, riding the 131 miles (211 km) in a record time of 6h 19' 31". Kirkham's time was not beaten until 1925 by Richard "Fatty" Lamb. He had previously finished 5th in 1909. and finished outside the top 20 in 1912.

In 6 attempts, Kirkham was never able to set the fastest time nor win the Warrnambool to Melbourne Classic, his best result being 2nd fastest time in 1922. He finished 28th in 1907, 128th in 1908, 18th in 1909, 19th in 1910 and 21st in 1923. Kirkham intended to retire after the 1924 Warrnambool, however he was knocked down by a motor car two weeks prior to the race.

He competed in the 1914 Tour de France with Iddo Munro and finished 17th in the general classification. His best result was 9th in Stage 13, a 325 km (202 mi) mountain stage from Belfort to Longwy. After the Tour, whilst in Paris he won a bet in riding 25 miles (40 km) in 60 minutes. Kirkham took up farming during World War I and resumed racing in 1920. Kirkham was a successful six-day racer in Australia. Kirkham's last race was the Cycle Traders 100 mile in 1924. He was returning home from that race when he was hit by a motorist and was so badly injured that he was forced to retire. He coached Hubert Opperman in his first race.

He died on 30 April 1930 in St Arnaud, Victoria. He was buried in Dandenong Cemetery.

== Major results ==
1910
1st Scone to Newcastle
1st and fastest Goulburn to Sydney Classic
1911
2nd and fastest Goulburn to Sydney Classic

1913
1st in Melbourne, Six Days
1914
17th general classification Tour de France
9th Milan - Sanremo
1922
2nd fastest Warrnambool to Melbourne Classic
