= Ali Neffati =

Tunisian cyclist

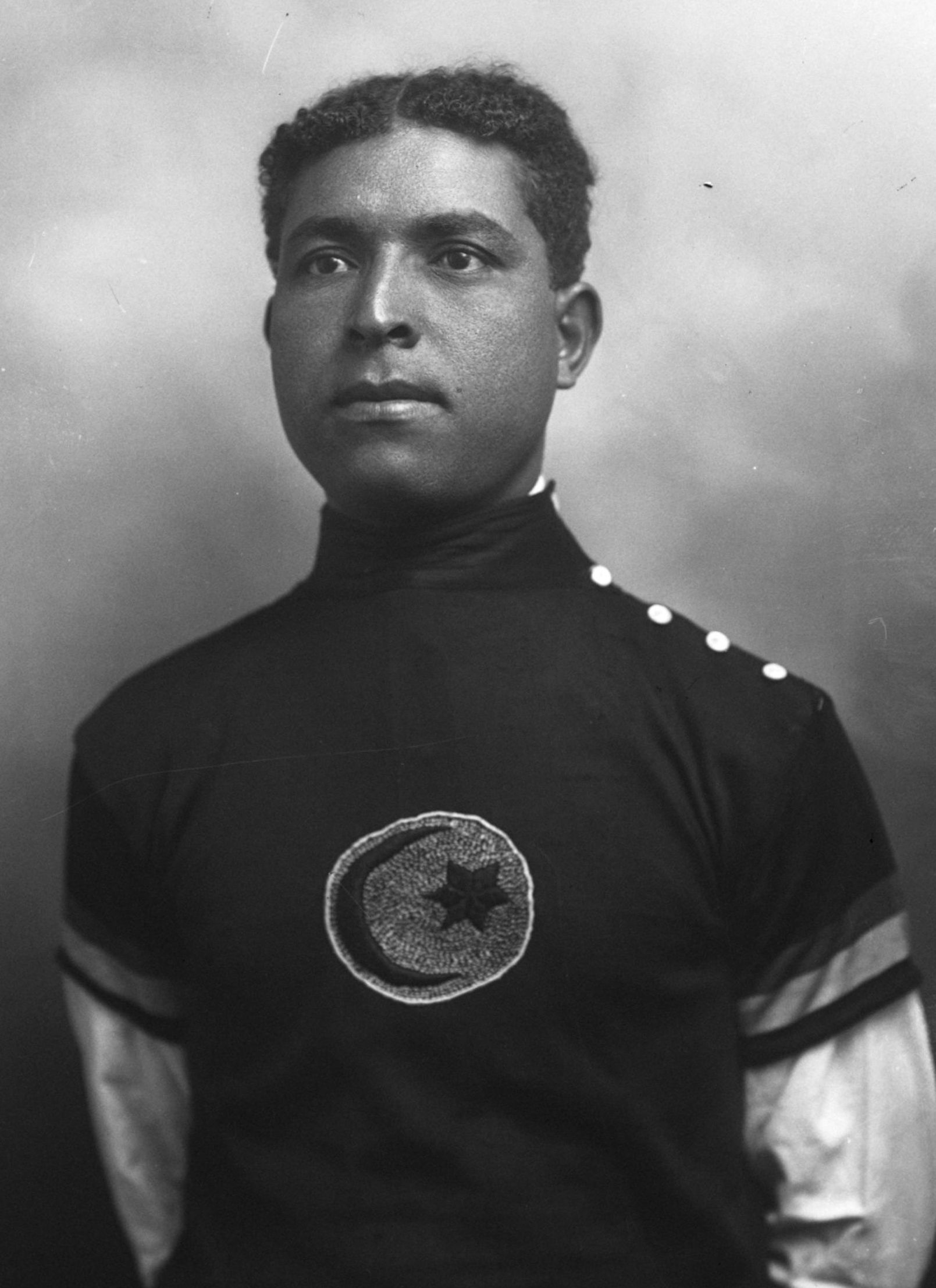
- Neffati in 1913

Personal information
- Born: January 22, 1895 Tunis, French Protectorate of Tunisia
- Died: April 19, 1974 (aged 79) Paris, France

Cycling career
- Sport: Cycling
- Disciplines: Track, road
- Role: Rider

Professional teams
- 1919: I.V.E. - Soly
- 1922: Bianchi - Laborda

Ali Neffati (22 January 1895 in Tunis – 19 April 1974 in Paris) was a Tunisian cyclist who was professional between 1913 and 1930. He is known for being the first person from the African continent to participate in the Tour de France, when he participated in the 1913 edition. He also was in the 1914 Tour de France, but didn't finish either of them. In the 1914 Tour, he was hit by a car from the organization, and could not continue.

Neffati's cycling career began in 1908 in Tunisia, where he won several track championships. In 1913 he accepted an invitation to the Tour de France. He was iconic for wearing a fez instead of the traditional cap. Despite the setback caused to his career by the World War I, he returned to racing in 1918 and became a regular at major races of the time. He was one of 87 riders to compete in the Circuit des Champs de Bataille in early 1919, the stages of which crossed towns devastated by World War I; the race is remembered as the toughest in cycling history.

== Major results ==
1913
National chase champion
National stayer champion
1914
National sprint champion
1917
9th Paris–Tours
1918
9th Paris–Tours
Stage 1 Course du Midi
Stage 1 Volta Ciclista Provincia Tarragona
2nd Volta Ciclista Provincia Tarragona
1925
2nd French National Stayers Championships
