= 1914 Tour de France =

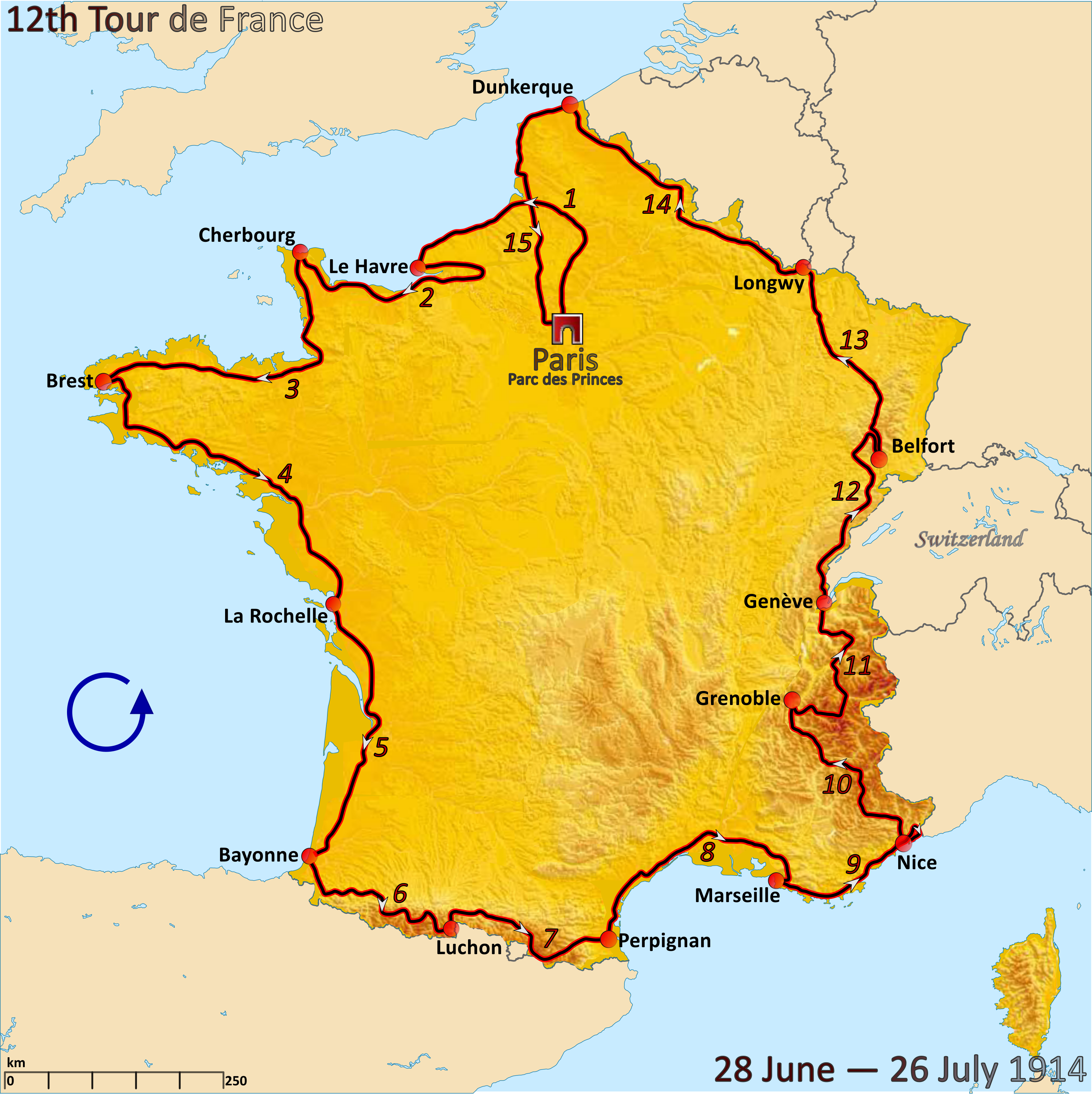
- Route of the 1914 Tour de France followed counterclockwise, starting in Paris

Race details
- Dates: 28 June – 26 July 1914
- Stages: 15
- Distance: 5,380 km (3,343 mi)
- Winning time: 200h 28' 48"

Results
	Winner	Philippe Thys (BEL)	(Peugeot–Wolber)
	Second	Henri Pélissier (FRA)	(Peugeot–Wolber)
	Third	Jean Alavoine (FRA)	(Peugeot–Wolber)

The 1914 Tour de France was the 12th edition of the Tour de France, taking place in 15 stages from 28 June to 26 July. The total distance was 5,380 kilometres (3,340 mi) and the average speed of the riders was 26.835 kilometres per hour (16.674 mph). It was won by the Belgian cyclist Philippe Thys.

The day the Tour began, Franz Ferdinand, Archduke of Austria was assassinated in Sarajevo, marking the start of the July Crisis which would lead to World War I. On 3 August Germany invaded Belgium and declared war on France, making this Tour the last for five years, until 1919. The three men who won the Tour between 1907 and 1910 would die in the war.

== Innovations and changes ==
Not much changed from the 1913 Tour de France, the most important novelty was the introduction of frame numbers.

Philippe Thys, who had won the 1913 Tour de France, was returning in 1914 and considered favourite, together with his teammate Henri Pélissier. Apart from him six other previous Tour de France winners started the race: Louis Trousselier, Lucien Petit-Breton, Octave Lapize, François Faber, Odile Defraye and Gustave Garrigou. Four more cyclists started the race that would later win a Tour de France: Firmin Lambot, Léon Scieur, Henri Pélissier and Lucien Buysse. This number of 11 former or future Tour de France winners on the start line is a record. In addition, Italian champion Costante Girardengo, started the race, but Girardengo was not yet the champion from 1919 on, and was not the team leader.

In 1914, the first cyclists from Australia started the Tour de France, Don Kirkham and Iddo Munro. They also finished the race, in 17th place and 20th place.

The cyclists used whistles, to warn other persons that they were coming (mainly downhill).

== Race overview ==
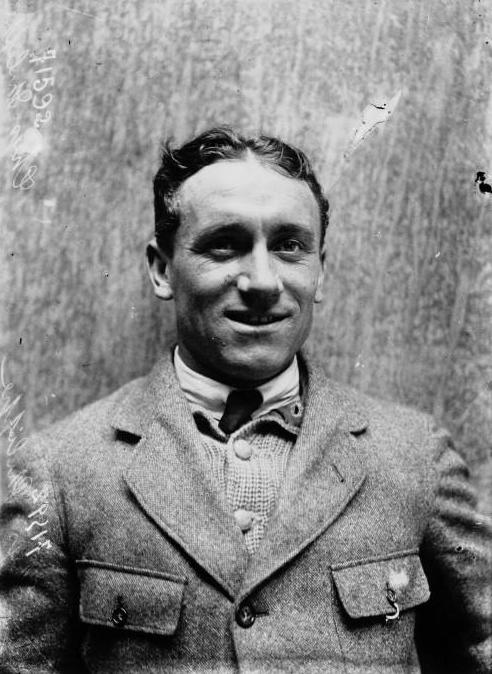
Philippe Thys, the winner of the 1914 Tour de France

Thys was dominant in the entire race. Even though he only won the first stage, he finished in the top five every other stage. In that first stage, Jean Rossius finished second with the same time. The second stage was won by Rossius, with Thys in the same time. Both had the same time, and the same finishing places, so they were both given the lead in the general classification.

In the third stage, the riders reached the first check point one hour late, after they had taken the wrong route and rode 30 km in the wrong direction. The race was then stopped and restarted from the first check point.

The lead remained shared between Rossius and Thys until after the fifth stage, when Thys got away from Rossius. After that stage, Pélissier was third in the classification with only 5'27" behind.

In the sixth stage, the Pyrenees mountains appeared. The stage was won by Lambot, with Thys only 7 minutes behind. The other competitors did worse, with Pélissier losing over 30 minutes and Rossius over one hour. Thys was firmly in the lead. In that stage, Ali Neffati was hit by a car from the organization, and could not continue. According to the rules, he did not have to finish the stage, and was given a time which allowed him to keep his 42nd place in the overall classification. In the sixth stage, Girardengo crashed again, and retired from the Tour, never to come back.

The weather was hot, and in the eighth stage, the cyclists did not want to race and cycled at a low speed. Tour organiser Henri Desgrange then stopped the race, and organised a sprint tournament, with semifinals and finals, which was won by Octave Lapize. In the ninth stage, former winner Faber was penalised with 90 minutes, because he had been pushed and took drinks from a motor cyclist.

Pélissier, still in second place, had done his best to win back time, but he only managed to win back a few minutes. After the thirteenth stage, he was still 31 minutes and 50 seconds behind. In the 14th stage to Dunkerque, Thys' bicycle broke. It was not allowed to get help while fixing your bicycle, and in the 1913 Tour de France, Eugene Christophe lost his chances of a victory by repairing his own bicycle. Thys decided to take the risk of a time penalty, and bought a new wheel at a shop. This cost him a 30-minute penalty, which left Thys with only 1:50 ahead of Pélissier. Pélissier did his best to overcome the gap, but Thys followed him. In the stage to Dunkerque, Pélissier claimed spectators prevented him from getting away from Thys. In the end, Thys stayed less than two minutes ahead of Henri Pélissier, and managed to keep that margin until the finish in Paris.

== Results ==
In each stage, all cyclists started together. The cyclist who reached the finish first, was the winner of the stage. The time that each cyclist required to finish the stage was recorded. For the general classification, these times were added up; the cyclist with the least accumulated time was the race leader.

=== Stage results ===
Stage characteristics and winners
Stage	Date	Course	Distance	Type (Note: In 1914, there was no distinction in the rules between plain stages and mountain stages; the icons shown here indicate which stages included mountains.)	Winner	Race leader
1	28 June	Paris to Le Havre	388 km (241 mi)	Plain stage	Philippe Thys (BEL)	Philippe Thys (BEL) (Note: From the first to the fifth stage, Thys and Rossius finished in the same times, leading the classification. In all sources, Thys is recorded as leader after the first stage, which he won, but from the second to the fifth stage, they are marked as joint leaders.)
2	30 June	Le Havre to Cherbourg-en-Cotentin	364 km (226 mi)	Plain stage	Jean Rossius (BEL)	Philippe Thys (BEL); Jean Rossius (BEL)
3	2 July	Cherbourg to Brest	405 km (252 mi)	Plain stage	Emile Engel (FRA)	Philippe Thys (BEL); Jean Rossius (BEL)
4	4 July	Brest to La Rochelle	470 km (290 mi)	Plain stage	Oscar Egg (SUI)	Philippe Thys (BEL); Jean Rossius (BEL)
5	6 July	La Rochelle to Bayonne	376 km (234 mi)	Plain stage	Oscar Egg (SUI)	Philippe Thys (BEL); Jean Rossius (BEL)
6	8 July	Bayonne to Luchon	326 km (203 mi)	Stage with mountain(s)	Firmin Lambot (BEL)	Philippe Thys (BEL)
7	10 July	Luchon to Perpignan	323 km (201 mi)	Stage with mountain(s)	Jean Alavoine (FRA)	Philippe Thys (BEL)
8	12 July	Perpignan to Marseille	370 km (230 mi)	Plain stage	Octave Lapize (FRA)	Philippe Thys (BEL)
9	14 July	Marseille to Nice	338 km (210 mi)	Stage with mountain(s)	Jean Rossius (BEL)	Philippe Thys (BEL)
10	16 July	Nice to Grenoble	323 km (201 mi)	Stage with mountain(s)	Henri Pélissier (FRA)	Philippe Thys (BEL)
11	18 July	Grenoble to Geneva	325 km (202 mi)	Stage with mountain(s)	Gustave Garrigou (FRA)	Philippe Thys (BEL)
12	20 July	Geneva to Belfort	325 km (202 mi)	Stage with mountain(s)	Henri Pélissier (FRA)	Philippe Thys (BEL)
13	22 July	Belfort to Longwy	325 km (202 mi)	Stage with mountain(s)	François Faber (LUX)	Philippe Thys (BEL)
14	24 July	Longwy to Dunkerque	390 km (240 mi)	Plain stage	François Faber (LUX)	Philippe Thys (BEL)
15	26 July	Dunkerque to Paris	340 km (210 mi)	Plain stage	Henri Pélissier (FRA)	Philippe Thys (BEL)
	Total		5,380 km (3,343 mi)			

=== General classification ===
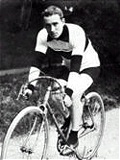
Philippe Thys, the winner of the 1914 Tour de France.

Final general classification (1–10)
Rank	Rider	Team	Time
1	Philippe Thys (BEL)	Peugeot–Wolber	200h 28' 48"
2	Henri Pélissier (FRA)	Peugeot–Wolber	+ 1' 50"
3	Jean Alavoine (FRA)	Peugeot–Wolber	+ 36' 53"
4	Jean Rossius (BEL)	Alcyon–Soly	+ 1h 57' 05"
5	Gustave Garrigou (FRA)	Peugeot–Wolber	+ 3h 00' 21"
6	Emile Georget (FRA)	Peugeot–Wolber	+ 3h 20' 59"
7	Alfons Spiessens (BEL)	J.B. Louvet–Continental	+ 3h 53' 55"
8	Firmin Lambot (BEL)	Peugeot–Wolber	+ 5h 08' 54"
9	François Faber (LUX)	Peugeot–Wolber	+ 6h 15' 53"
10	Louis Heusghem (BEL)	Peugeot–Wolber	+ 7h 49' 02"

Final general classification (11–54)
Rank	Rider	Sponsor	Time
11	Eugène Christophe (FRA)	Peugeot–Wolber	+ 8h 31' 58"
12	Ernest Paul (FRA)	Delage–Continental	+ 9h 42' 51"
13	Oscar Egg (SUI)	Peugeot–Wolber	+ 10h 00' 40"
14	Léon Scieur (BEL)	Thoman–Joly	+ 10h 02' 30"
15	Camille Botte (BEL)	—	+ 10h 14' 33"
16	Angelo Erba (ITA)	Alleluia–Continental	+ 11h 21' 22"
17	Donald Kirkham (AUS)	Phebus–Dunlop	+ 11h 53' 39"
18	Hector Tiberghien (BEL)	Delage–Continental	+ 12h 23' 21"
19	Jacques Coomans (BEL)	Thoman–Joly	+ 12h 24' 15"
20	Iddo Munro (AUS)	Phebus–Dunlop	+ 12h 34' 57"
21	Charles Charron (FRA)	Delage–Continental	+ 12h 59' 23"
22	Henri Devroye (BEL)	Armor–Soly	+ 13h 22' 14"
23	Maurice Brocco (FRA)	Gladiator–Dunlop	+ 14h 32' 36"
24	Julien Tuytten (BEL)	—	+ 14h 36' 14"
25	Vincenzo Borgarello (ITA)	Clement–Dunlop	+ 15h 18' 21"
26	Louis Petitjean (BEL)	Delage–Continental	+ 15h 38' 44"
27	Jules Nempon (FRA)	J.B. Louvet–Continental	+ 16h 32' 55"
28	René Vandenberghe (BEL)	J.B. Louvet–Continental	+ 17h 05' 07"
29	Marcel Baumler (FRA)	Peugeot–Wolber	+ 17h 07' 55"
30	Marcel Godivier (FRA)	Gladiator–Dunlop	+ 18h 18' 57"
31	Paul Duboc (FRA)	Automoto	+ 18h 35' 32"
32	Pierre Everaerts (BEL)	—	+ 19h 21' 04"
33	Ottavio Pratesi (ITA)	—	+ 20h 31' 40"
34	Constant Ménager (FRA)	Gladiator–Dunlop	+ 20h 58' 45"
35	Charles Cruchon (FRA)	Gladiator–Dunlop	+ 21h 04' 56"
36	Jules Deloffre (FRA)	—	+ 22h 03' 15"
37	Camillo Bertarelli (ITA)	Alleluia–Continental	+ 23h 08' 26"
38	Louis Trousselier (FRA)	Automoto	+ 23h 44' 30"
39	Adrien Alpini (ITA)	—	+ 26h 11' 22"
40	Gaston Degy (FRA)	Automoto	+ 29h 05' 54"
41	Raymond Harquet (FRA)	Alleluia–Continental	+ 30h 04' 05"
42	Louis Engel (FRA)	Delage–Continental	+ 30h 54' 28"
43	Emile Guyon (SUI)	—	+ 30h 55' 10"
44	Mario Spinelli (ITA)	—	+ 35h 13' 35"
45	Charles Kippert (FRA)	Gladiator–Dunlop	+ 35h 56' 03"
46	Charles Dumont (SUI)	—	+ 37h 42' 31"
47	René Cottrel (FRA)	—	+ 37h 42' 31"
48	Sante Goi (ITA)	—	+ 52h 15' 32"
49	Emilio Cuchetti (ITA)	—	+ 59h 20' 16"
50	Gaston Neboux (FRA)	—	+ 59h 59' 01"
51	Henri Allard (BEL)	—	+ 67h 46' 24"
52	Henri Alavoine (FRA)	—	+ 72h 55' 21"
53	Marcel Rottie (FRA)	—	+ 84h 03' 10"
54	Henri Leclerc (FRA)	—	+ 99h 04' 45"

=== Other classifications ===
Camille Botte, ranked 15 in the general classification, became the winner of the "isolés" category. The "isolés" classification was calculated in the same way as the general classification, but only the isolated cyclists (not part of a team) were eligible.

The organising newspaper l'Auto named Firmin Lambot the meilleur grimpeur. This unofficial title is the precursor to the mountains classification.

== Aftermath ==
One week after the race ended, Germany had declared war on France, starting World War I in France. This made the organization of a big cycling race impossible for the next four years, and the Tour de France would start again in 1919. By that time, Tour de France champions Lucien Petit-Breton, François Faber and Octave Lapize had died in the first world war. The winner of the 1914 Tour de France, Philippe Thys, would survive the war, and go on for his third victory in 1920. Henri Pélissier, the runner-up, would win the Tour de France in 1923.

== Bibliography ==
- Augendre, Jacques (2016). "Guide historique" [Historical guide] (PDF). Tour de France (in French). Paris: Amaury Sport Organisation. Archived (PDF) from the original on 17 August 2016.
- Cleijne, Jan (2014). Legends of the Tour. London: Head of Zeus. ISBN 978-1-78185-998-8.
- McGann, Bill; McGann, Carol (2006). The Story of the Tour de France: 1903–1964. Vol. 1. Indianapolis, IN: Dog Ear Publishing. ISBN 978-1-59858-180-5.
