= André Trousselier =

French footballer and cyclist

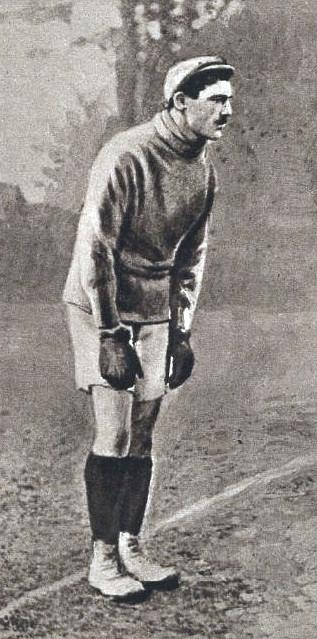
- André Trousselier in 1907
- Born: 29 May 1887; Paris, France
- Died: 10 April 1968 (aged 80); Paris, France
- Citizenship: French
- Occupations: Footballer and cyclist
- Known for: Winning the Liège–Bastogne–Liège in 1908
Association football career
- Position: Goalkeeper
Senior career*
Years	Team	Apps	(Gls)
1907–1912	Racing Club de France		
1912–1914	CASG Paris		
- * Club domestic league appearances and goals

André Trousselier (29 May 1887 – 10 April 1968) was a French footballer who played as a goalkeeper for Racing Club de France, and a racing cyclist, who won the 1908 edition of the Liège–Bastogne–Liège.

== Sporting career ==
=== Cycling career ===
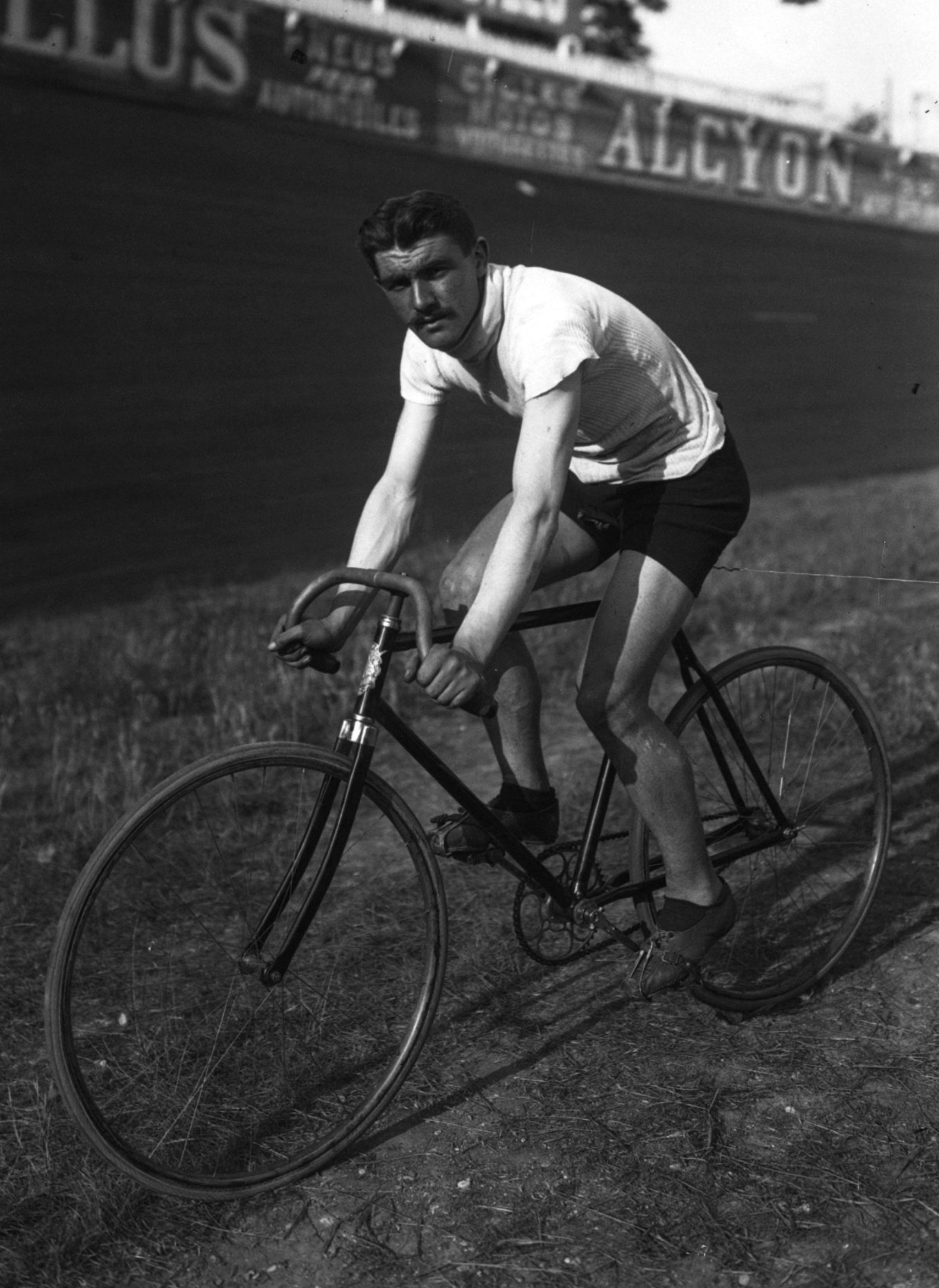
André Trousselier in 1908

Initially a racing cyclist, Trousselier won the first professional edition of Liège-Bastogne-Liège in 1908, which had been run as an amateur race between 1892 and 1894. He remained the only non-Belgian winner of the doyenne until 1930. He was the brother of several cyclists, the best known of whom was Louis Trousselier, winner of the 1905 Tour de France.

=== Footballing career ===
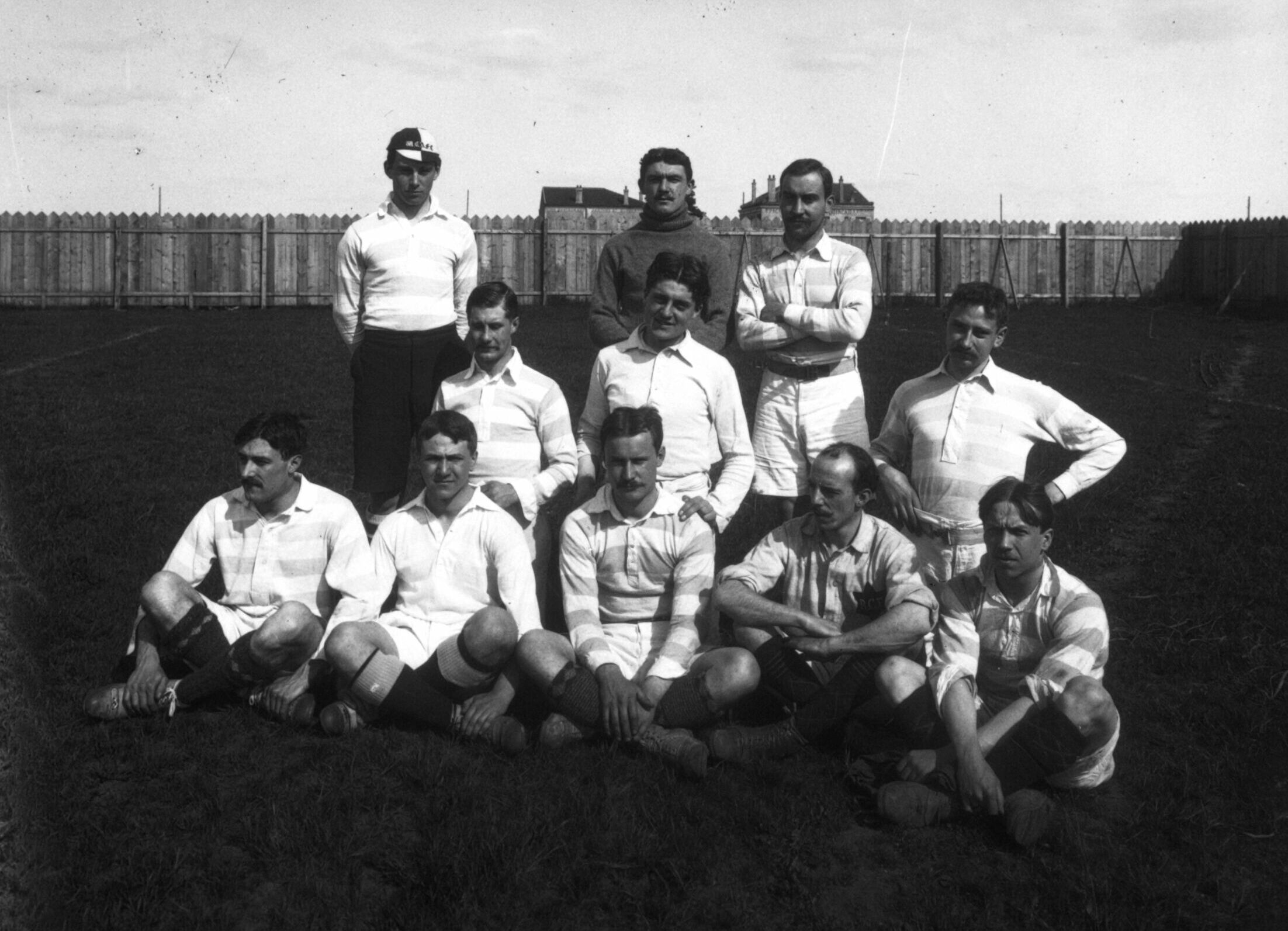
Trousselier (standing in the center with the dark clothes) with the Racing team that won the 1906 Coupe Dewar final.

At the same time, he devoted himself to football, being the starting goalkeeper of Racing de France since 1906, and helping his side win the 1906 Coupe Dewar, beating Gallia Club 2–1 in the final at the Stade de Charentonneau on 6 May. In the following year, on 7 April 1908, he started in the final of the 1907 UFSFA Football Championship, which ended in a 3–2 win over RC Roubaix.

In his first match upon returning from the regiment, Trousselier conceded 5 goals in a 2–5 loss to Olympique lillois, with the French press stating that he "was good, but he will be even better when he has trained enough". Later he wore the colours of CASG, where his younger brother Auguste, who played as a forward.

== Later life and death ==
After the First World War, Trousselier became a seller of wreaths and artificial flowers.

Trousselier died in Paris on 10 April 1968, at the age of 80.

== Honours ==
=== As a footballer ===
Racing Club de France

- USFSA Football Championship:
  - Champions (1): 1907
- Coupe Dewar:
  - Champions (1): 1906

=== As a cyclist ===
- Liège–Bastogne–Liège:
  - Champions (1): 1908
