= Philippe Thys (cyclist) =

Belgian cyclist

Philippe Thys (Thĳs)
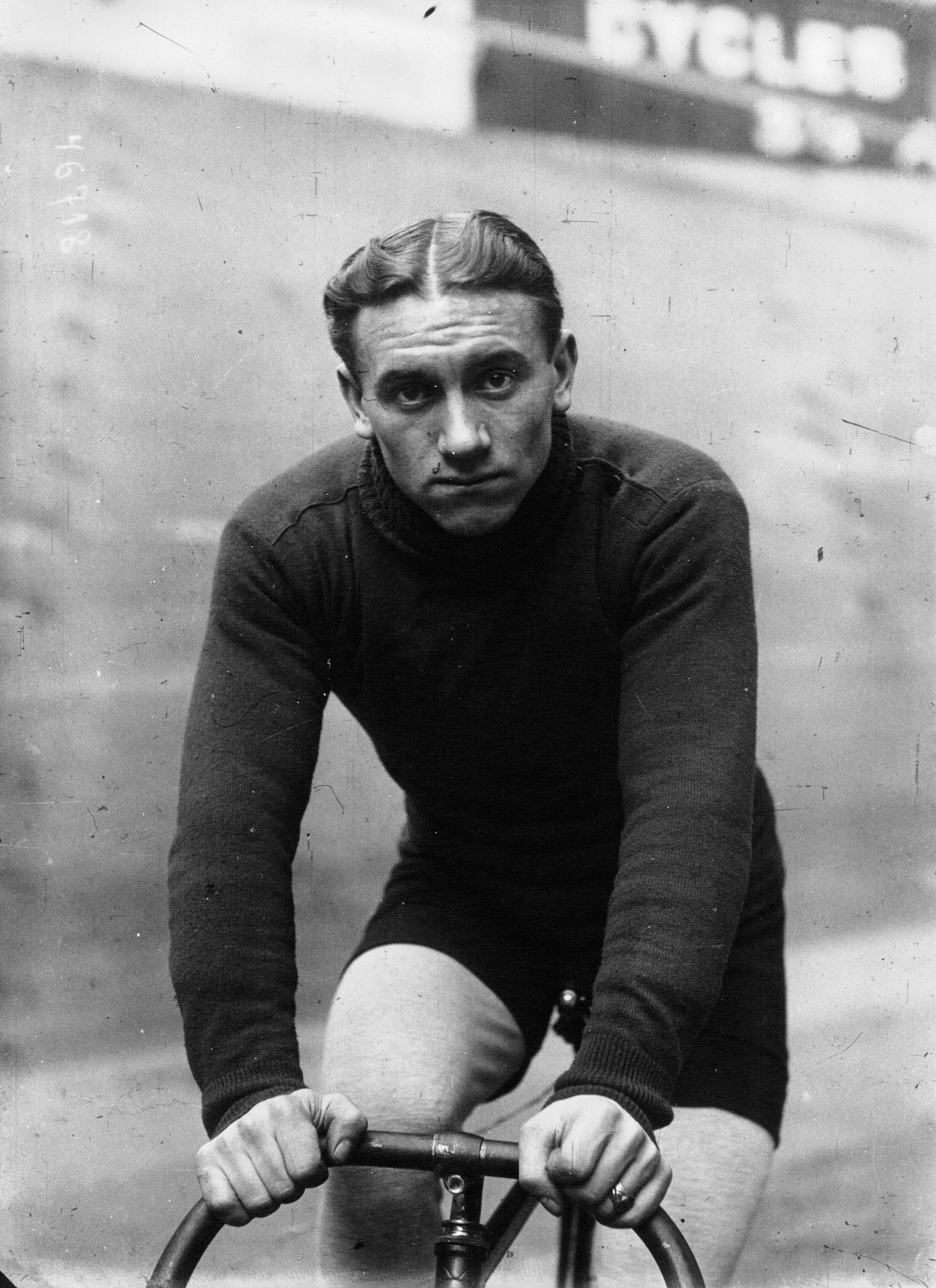
- Thys in 1913

Personal information
- Full name: Philippe Thĳs
- Nickname: Le basset (The Basset Hound)
- Born: 8 October 1889 Anderlecht, Belgium
- Died: 16 January 1971 (aged 81) Anderlecht, Belgium

Cycling career
- Sport: Cycling
- Discipline: Road
- Role: Rider

Professional teams
- 1912–1914: Peugeot–Wolber
- 1917–1918: Peugeot–Wolber
- 1919–1921: La Sportive
- 1922–1924: Peugeot–Wolber
- 1925: Automoto–Hutchinson
- 1927: Opel–ZR III

Major wins
- Cyclo-cross National Championships (1910) Road Grand Tours Tour de France General classification (1913, 1914, 1920) Mountains classification (1913) 13 individual stages (1913, 1914, 1920, 1922, 1924) Stage races Circuit Français Peugeot (1911) One-day races and Classics Giro di Lombardia (1917) Paris–Tours (1917) Tours–Paris (1918) Paris–Menen (1914) Limburgse Dageraad (1927) Critérium des As (1921)

Philippe Thys (pronounced [fi.lip tis]; Dutch: Philippe Thĳs; 8 October 1889 – 16 January 1971) was a Belgian cyclist and three times winner of the Tour de France.

== Professional career ==
In 1910, Thys won Belgium's first national cyclo-cross championship. The following year he won the Circuit Français Peugeot, followed by stage races from Paris to Toulouse and Paris to Turin. He then turned professional to ride the Tour de France.

Thys won the Tour in 1913 despite breaking his bicycle fork, and needing to find a bicycle shop to mend it. The repair induced a 10-minute penalty, but he won with a lead of just under nine minutes.

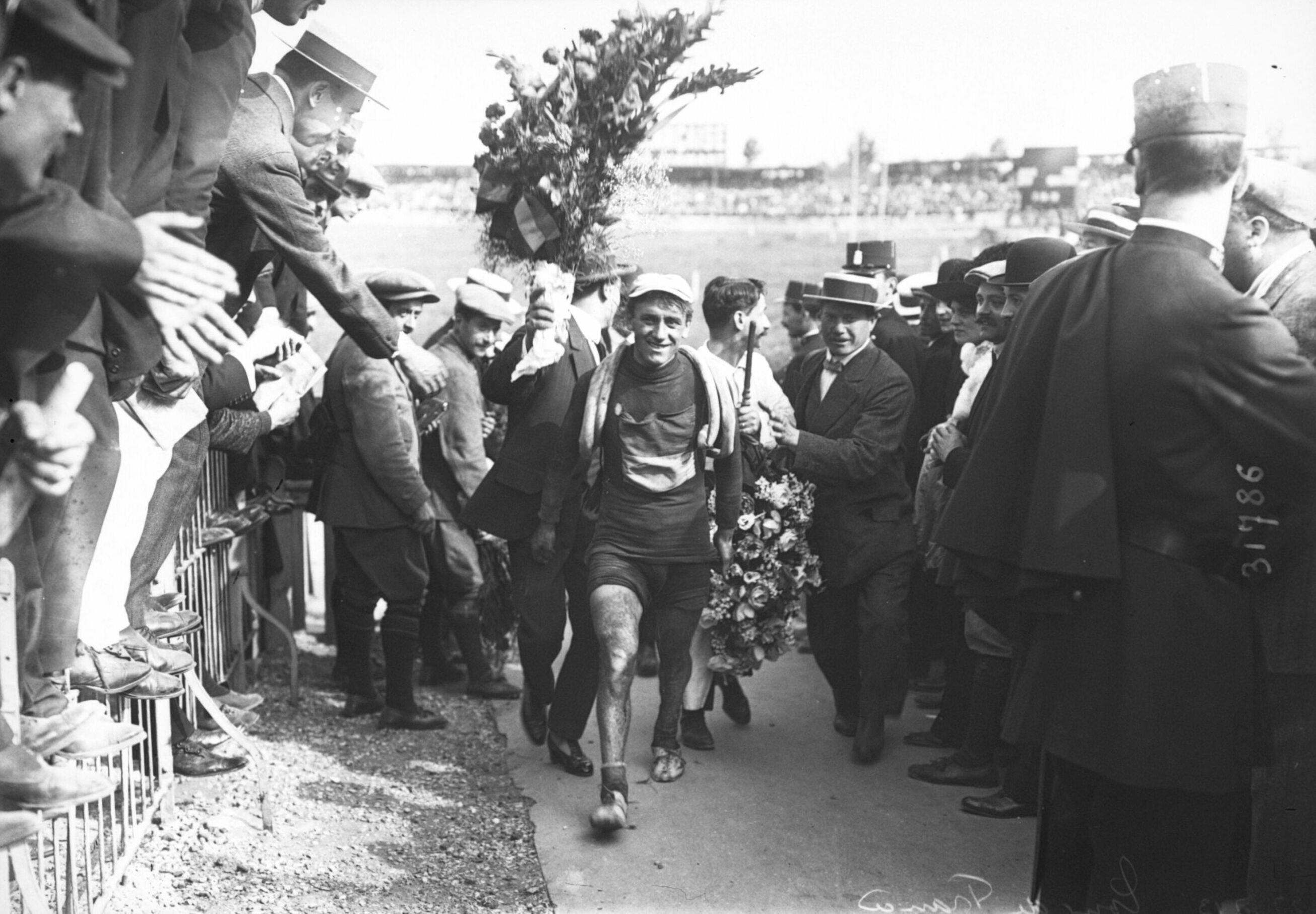
Thys, celebrating his 1913 Tour de France win

Thys took the stage and the race lead when Eugène Christophe broke his fork on the way to Luchon. Marcel Buysse overtook him in the results the following day. Another broken fork on the way to Nice gave Thys the lead again but drama continued when he fell on the penultimate stage from Longwy to Dunkirk. Despite being knocked out and being penalised for help from teammates to repair his bike, he won 8 minutes and 37 seconds ahead of Gustave Garrigou, with Buysse third.

In 1914, he took his first stage victory, to Le Havre, holding the race from start to finish despite a 30-minute penalty for an unauthorised wheel change on the penultimate stage. His victory looked uncertain, his lead cut to less than two minutes ahead of Henri Pélissier. Ironically, on the final stage from Dunkirk to Paris, the Frenchman's supporters along the route who were expecting victory over the Belgian were the reason he was prevented from launching a breakaway. He won the stage but Thys finished on his wheel to win the Tour.

In 1917, Thys won Paris–Tours and the Giro di Lombardia. In 1918, he also won the second and last Tours–Paris. After World War I, Thys won the Tour a third and final time in 1920. He led from the second stage, Henri Desgrange writing "France is not unaware that, without the war, the crack rider from Anderlecht would be celebrating not his third Tour, but his fifth or sixth".

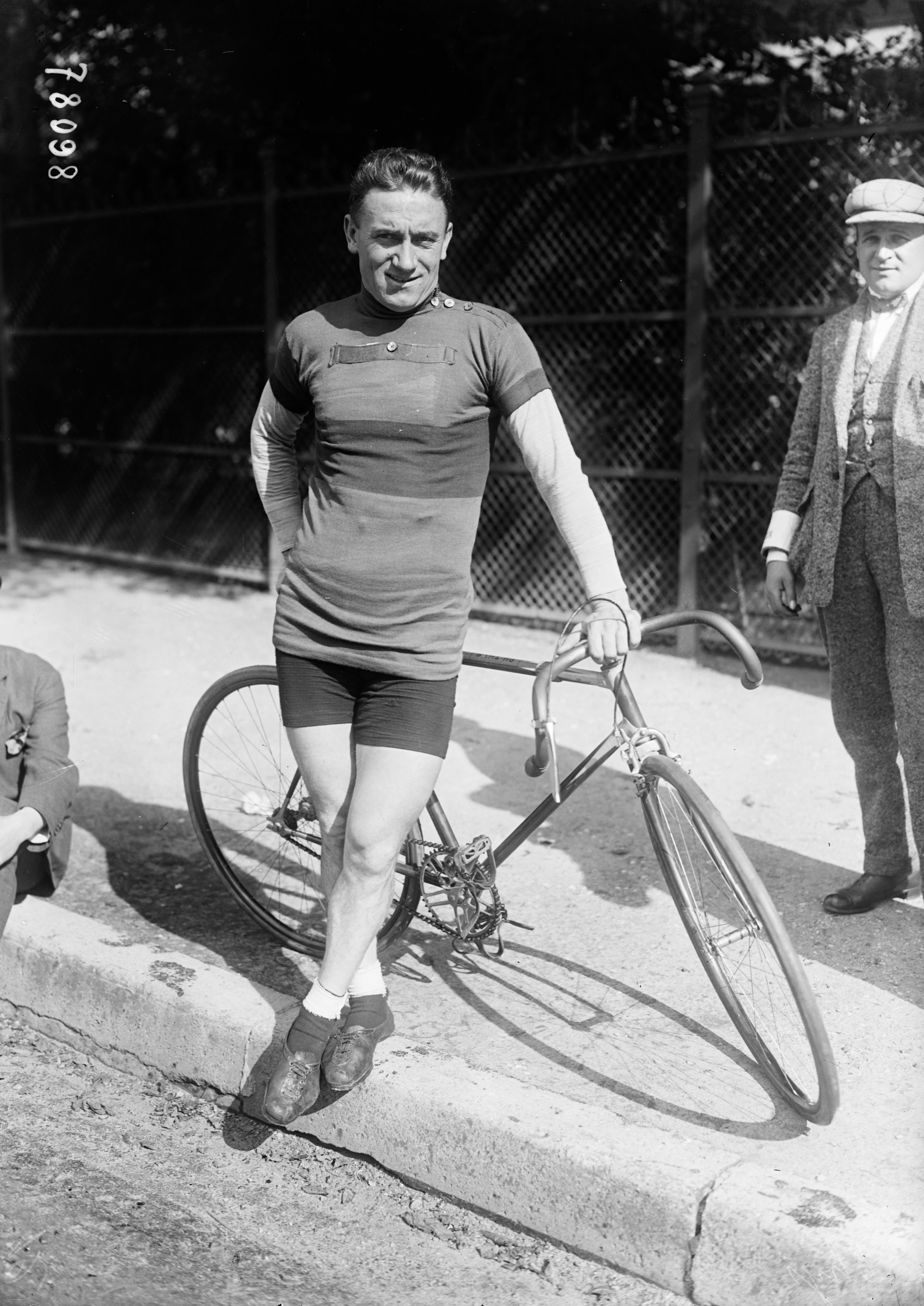
Philippe Thys at the 1922 Critérium des As

Not until 1955 did Louison Bobet equal Thys's record, and not until 1963 did Jacques Anquetil break it with four wins. Thys also rode in the 1922 Tour, winning five stages, and in the 1924 Tour, winning two stages.

Thys was one of a generation of cyclists whose careers were disrupted by the First World War. After retiring, he recalled that he had been asked by his manager, Alphonse Baugé, to wear a yellow jersey as leader of the Tour, although that distinction is more commonly attributed to Eugène Christophe.

== Career achievements ==
=== Major results ===
Amateur
1910
1st National Cyclo-cross Championships
1911
1st Overall Tour de France Independents

1st in 2 Stages

1st Overall Paris-Turin

1st in 2 Stages

1st Paris-Toulouse
1st Circuit Française Peugeot

Professional
1912
6th Overall Tour de France
1913
1st Overall Tour de France

1st Stage 6

1914
1st Overall Tour de France

1st Stage 1

1st Paris-Menin (fr)
3rd Paris–Tours
1917
1st Giro di Lombardia
1st Paris–Tours
1918
1st Tours-Paris
1919
1st Six Days of Brussels (with Marcel Dupuy)
2nd Paris–Roubaix
1920
1st Overall Tour de France

1st Stages 2, 9, 12 & 13

4th Road race, National Road Championships
4th Paris–Roubaix
4th Paris–Brussels
1921
1st Critérium des As
1st Paris–Lyon (with Jean Rossius)
1st Paris–Dijon (with Jean Rossius)
3rd Bordeaux–Paris
4th Giro della Provincia di Milano
10th Milan–San Remo
1922
Tour de France

1st Stages 4, 8, 9, 10 & 15

2nd Road race, National Road Championships
4th Bordeaux–Paris
5th Critérium des As
1923
1st Paris–Lyon (with Jean Alavoine)
2nd Circuit du Languedoc
8th Paris–Tours
1924
Tour de France

1st Stages 3 (tied with Théophile Beeckman) & 9

7th Paris–Roubaix
1925
3rd Six Days of Brussels (with Maurice De Wolf)
1927
1st Limburgse Dageraad
9th Rund um Leipzig

=== Grand Tour results ===
	1912	1913	1914	1915	1916	1917	1918	1919	1920	1921	1922	1923	1924	1925
Giro d'Italia	DNE	DNE	DNE	N/A	N/A	N/A	N/A	DNE	DNE	DNE	DNE	DNE	DNE	DNE
Stages won	—	—	—	N/A	N/A	N/A	N/A	—	—	—	—	—	—	—
Tour de France	6	1	1	N/A	N/A	N/A	N/A	DNF-1	1	DNF-2	14	DNF-9	11	DNF-9
Stages won	0	1	1	N/A	N/A	N/A	N/A	0	4	0	5	0	2	0
Vuelta a España	N/A	N/A	N/A	N/A	N/A	N/A	N/A	N/A	N/A	N/A	N/A	N/A	N/A	N/A
Stages won	N/A	N/A	N/A	N/A	N/A	N/A	N/A	N/A	N/A	N/A	N/A	N/A	N/A	N/A

Legend
1	Winner
2–3	Top three-finish
4–10	Top ten-finish
11–	Other finish
DNE	Did not enter
DNF-x	Did not finish (retired on stage x)
DNS-x	Did not start (not started on stage x)
HD-x	Finished outside time limit (occurred on stage x)
DSQ	Disqualified
N/A	Race/classification not held
NR	Not ranked in this classification

== Honours ==
- A velodrome, Piste Philippe Thys in La Robertsau, Strasbourg
- A street, Rue Philippe Thys in Strasbourg
- Introduced in the UCI Hall of Fame in 2002

== Books ==
- Van Thys tot Nys by Luc Lamon, Mark van Hamme in 2011, Houtekiet, 227 p. ISBN 9789089241405
- Philippe Thys: de vergeten drievoudig tourwinnaar by Johan Van Win in 2014, Ronde Tafel, 248 p. ISBN 9789491545153
