= Charles Juseret =

Belgian cyclist

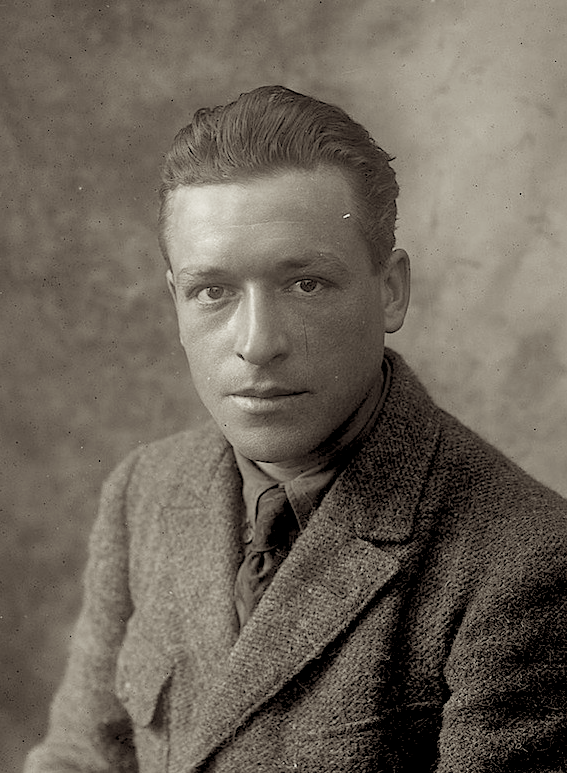

Personal information
- Born: 28 April 1892
- Died: 4 September 1973 (aged 81)

Cycling career
- Sport: Cycling
- Role: Rider

Charles Juseret (28 April 1892 – 4 September 1973) was a Belgian racing cyclist. He rode in the 1919 Tour de France.
