= Jean Rossius =

Belgian cyclist

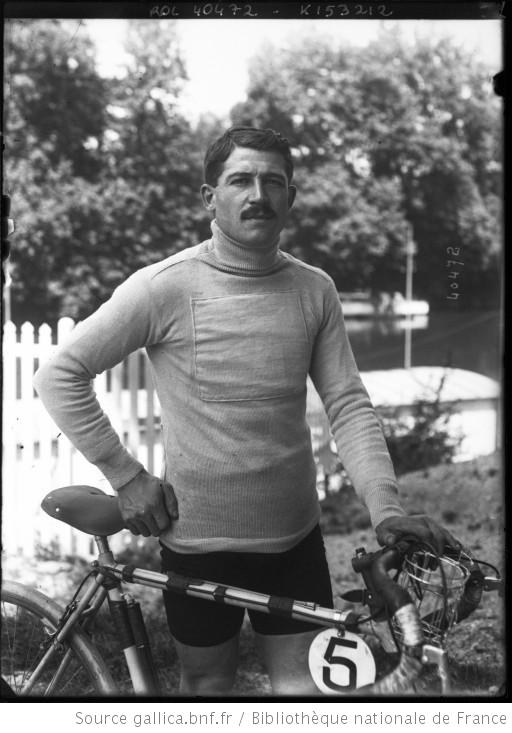
- Belgian road racing cyclist

Personal information
- Full name: Jean Rossius
- Born: 27 December 1890 Soumagne, Belgium
- Died: 2 May 1966 (aged 75) Liège, Belgium

Cycling career
- Sport: Cycling
- Discipline: Road
- Role: Rider

Major wins
- 5 stages Tour de France; Belgian National Road Race Champion

Jean Rossius (27 December 1890 – 2 May 1966) was a Belgian road racing cyclist who won five stages in total in the Tour de France. In the 1914 Tour de France he finished in fourth place in the overall classification, his best finishing.

== Major results ==
1914
Tour de France:

Winner stages 2 and 9
Leading general classification for 4 days (joint with Philippe Thys)

1919
Liège-Malmedy-Liège
(Belgium) Belgian National Road Race Championships
Tour de France:

Winner stage 1

1920
Retinne-Spa-Retinne
Tour de France:

Winner stages 7 and 15

1922
Paris-Saint-Étienne
