= Angelo Erba =

Italian cyclist

Personal information
- Born: 22 April 1889
- Died: 19 April 1967 (aged 77)

Cycling career
- Sport: Cycling
- Role: Rider

Angelo Erba (22 April 1889 – 19 April 1967) was an Italian racing cyclist. He rode in the 1921 Tour de France.
