= Iddo Munro =

Australian cyclist (1888–1980)

Personal information
- Full name: Iddo Robert Munro
- Nickname: Snowy
- Born: 26 March 1888 Warrnambool, Victoria, Australia
- Died: 27 October 1980 (aged 92) Melbourne, Australia

Cycling career
- Sport: Cycling
- Role: Rider

Iddo "Snowy" Munro (26 March 1888 – 27 October 1980) was an Australian racing cyclist. The highlights of his career were winning the Australasian long distance road championship in 1909 and competing in the 1914 Tour de France. Munro won the championship by winning the Blue Riband for the fastest time in the Warrnambool to Melbourne race. Munro set a record time of 7h 12' 51" which was not broken until 1931. Munro had a long association with the Warrnambool and his other efforts were 30th in 1907, 45th and fastest rider receiving over 10 minute start in 1908 and 60th in 1910.

In 1914, Munro and Don Kirkham were the first Australian cyclists to compete in the Tour de France. Munro finished 20th in the general classification and his best result was 10th in Stage 15.

There was some confusion about his given name, with some contemporary newspaper reports referring to him as "Ivor".

In 1910 Munro won the Cycle Traders 100 a 100 miles (160 km) race in the record time of 5h 01' 07". In 1914 on his return from the Tour de France, Munro finished 14th and 2nd fastest in the Cycle Traders 100.

Munro did not compete in 1912, having spent seven months traveling to England, France and America.

His return to cycling in 1913 was successful, starting in four Victorian races between 25 and 80 miles finishing either first or fastest times in each with victories over top riders including twice defeating Don Kirkham.

In 1915 Munro and others broke away from the League of Victorian Wheelmen to form the Victorian Racing Cyclists' Union and competed at a meeting on 27 February 1915. As a consequence the League of Victorian Wheelmen disqualified those riders for twelve months from competing in races organised under the auspices of the League.

After his retirement from cycling Munro drove a hire car and would follow the Warrnambool race in his car. In 1931 Munro was said to have accurately predicted that his time would be easily broken because of the favorable conditions, a faster course than in 1909 and the use of singles.

Munro died on 27 October 1980 after experiencing heart problems.
