= List of teams and cyclists in the 1911 Tour de France =

As in the year before, there were two categories of riders in the 1911 Tour de France. The best riders started in sponsored teams; there were four teams, with 37 riders in total. The stages had checkpoints where riders had to sign, and on these checkpoints the sponsored riders were allowed to be given food and drinks. The other category consisted of 67 isolated riders; they were not allowed to be given food or drinks during these checkpoints.

The previous edition had been a close battle between teammates Octave Lapize and François Faber from the Alcyon team, won by Lapize. Lapize had changed teams to the La Française team, where he was joined by former winner Lucien Petit-Breton (winner in 1907 and 1908). Petit-Breton was a late replacement for Cyrille van Hauwaert, who was not feeling healthy enough to ride the Tour.

== Cyclists ==
=== By starting number ===
Legend
No.	Starting number worn by the rider during the Tour
Pos.	Position in the general classification
DNF	Denotes a rider who did not finish

No.	Name	Nationality	Team	Pos.	Ref
1	Octave Lapize	France	La Française	DNF	
2	Émile Georget	France	La Française	3	
3	Lucien Mazan	France	La Française	DNF	
4	Georges Passerieu	France	La Française	DNF	
5	Charles Crupelandt	France	La Française	4	
6	Marcel Godivier	France	La Française	6	
7	Paul Duboc	France	La Française	2	
8	Alphonse Charpiot	France	La Française	DNF	
9	Charles Cruchon	France	La Française	7	
10	Julien Maitron	France	La Française	14	
11	François Faber	Luxembourg	Alcyon-Dunlop	DNF	
12	Gustave Garrigou	France	Alcyon-Dunlop	1	
13	Louis Trousselier	France	Alcyon-Dunlop	DNF	
14	Ernest Paul	France	Alcyon-Dunlop	8	
15	Eugène Christophe	France	Alcyon-Dunlop	DNF	
16	André Blaise	Belgium	Alcyon-Dunlop	DNF	
17	Louis Heusghem	Belgium	Alcyon-Dunlop	5	
18	Jules Masselis	Belgium	Alcyon-Dunlop	DNF	
19	Maurice Brocco	France	Alcyon-Dunlop	DNF	
20	René Vandenberghe	Belgium	Alcyon-Dunlop	DNF	
21	Henri Cornet	France	Le Globe	12	
22	Henri Devroye	Belgium	Le Globe	10	
23	Maurice Pardon	France	Le Globe	23	
24	Frédéric Saillot	France	Le Globe	DNF	
25	Philippe Pautrat	France	Le Globe	DNF	
26	Albert Dupont	Belgium	Le Globe	9	
27	Constant Ménager	France	Le Globe	22	
28	Firmin Lambot	Belgium	Le Globe	11	
29	Lucien Pothier	France	Le Globe	20	
30	Jules Nempon	France	Le Globe	DNF	
31	Alfred Faure	France	Automoto	18	
32	Georges Paulmier	France	Automoto	16	
33	Ferdinand Lafourcade	France	Automoto	DNF	
34	Édouard Léonard	France	Automoto	21	
35	Maurice Leturgie	France	Automoto	DNF	
36	Constant Niedergang	France	Automoto	DNF	
37	Ernest Ricaux	France	Automoto	26	
101	Louis Poyet	Switzerland	Lone rider	DNF	
103	Edouard Chaudron	France	Lone rider	DNF	
104	Pietro Ghislotti	Italy	Lone rider	27	
105	André Kuhm	France	Lone rider	DNF	
106	Julien Gabory	France	Lone rider	DNF	
107	Paul Trippier	France	Lone rider	DNF	
108	Jean Brethoux	France	Lone rider	DNF	
109	Lucien Roquebert	France	Lone rider	28	
110	Léon Rabot	France	Lone rider	DNF	
112	André Thieullens	France	Lone rider	DNF	
113	Henri Alavoine	France	Lone rider	DNF	
115	Lucien Léman	France	Lone rider	DNF	
116	Paul Coppens	France	Lone rider	DNF	
117	Charles Pavese	France	Lone rider	DNF	
118	François Lemoigne	France	Lone rider	DNF	
119	Henri Yvon	France	Lone rider	DNF	
120	Raphaël Galiero	France	Lone rider	DNF	
122	Georges Devilly	France	Lone rider	DNF	
124	Ernest Gargat	France	Lone rider	DNF	
126	Paul Armbruster	France	Lone rider	DNF	
127	Henri Anthoine	France	Lone rider	DNF	
128	Ferdinand Payan	France	Lone rider	DNF	
129	François Lafourcade	France	Lone rider	DNF	
131	Georges Fleury	France	Lone rider	DNF	
132	Louis Coolsaet	France	Lone rider	24	
134	Pierre Dane	France	Lone rider	DNF	
135	Alcide Rivière	France	Lone rider	DNF	
136	Léon Riche	France	Lone rider	DNF	
137	Édouard Wattelier	France	Lone rider	DNF	
138	Louis Bonino	France	Lone rider	DNF	
139	Adrien Melaye	France	Lone rider	DNF	
141	Charles Dumont	Switzerland	Lone rider	DNF	
143	Ottavio Pratesi	Italy	Lone rider	17	
146	Pierino Fiore	Italy	Lone rider	DNF	
148	Aloïs Catteau	Belgium	Lone rider	DNF	
149	Robert Lamon	Belgium	Lone rider	DNF	
150	Paul Deman	Belgium	Lone rider	13	
151	Vincent D’Hulst	France	Lone rider	19	
152	Eugène Merville	France	Lone rider	DNF	
153	Victor Cathera	France	Lone rider	DNF	
157	Eugène Moura	France	Lone rider	DNF	
158	Emile Lachaise	France	Lone rider	DNF	
159	Jules Deloffre	France	Lone rider	15	
165	Marius Vilette	France	Lone rider	25	
166	Raymond Harquet	France	Lone rider	DNF	
167	Antoine Wattelier	France	Lone rider	DNF	
168	Georges Nemo	Belgium	Lone rider	DNF	
