= List of teams and cyclists in the 1912 Tour de France =

The 1912 Tour de France started with 131 cyclists; there were 10 teams of 5 cyclists each; these 50 cyclists included all favourites for the overall victory. The remaining 81 cyclists started in the isolés category. The Alcyon team had the pre-race favourite, Gustave Garrigou, the winner of the previous Tour de France. To help him, they hired Odile Defraye, who had performed well at the 1912 Tour of Belgium. At first, the Alcyon team did not want to select Defraye, but the Belgian representative of Alcyon posed commercial threats, and Defraye was selected.

== By starting number ==
Legend
No.	Starting number worn by the rider during the Tour
Pos.	Position in the general classification
DNF	Denotes a rider who did not finish

No.	Name	Nationality	Team	Pos.	Ref
1	Émile Georget	France	La Française	DNF	
2	Octave Lapize	France	La Française	DNF	
3	Charles Crupelandt	France	La Française	DNF	
4	Marcel Godivier	France	La Française	DNF	
5	Maurice Brocco	France	La Française	DNF	
6	Gustave Garrigou	France	Alcyon–Dunlop	3	
7	Paul Duboc	France	Alcyon–Dunlop	DNF	
8	André Blaise	Belgium	Alcyon–Dunlop	DNF	
9	Louis Heusghem	Belgium	Alcyon–Dunlop	11	
10	Odile Defraye	Belgium	Alcyon–Dunlop	1	
11	Lucien Mazan	France	Peugeot–Wolber	DNF	
12	Félicien Salmon	Belgium	Peugeot–Wolber	9	
13	Charles Deruyter	Belgium	Peugeot–Wolber	16	
14	Philippe Thys	Belgium	Peugeot–Wolber	6	
15	Marcel Buysse	Belgium	Peugeot–Wolber	4	
16	Alexandre Chauviere	France	Griffon	DNF	
17	Oscar Egg	Switzerland	Griffon	DNF	
18	Hector Tiberghien	Belgium	Griffon	7	
19	Médéric Fraissinet	France	Griffon	DNF	
20	Gabriel Figuet	France	Griffon	22	
21	Eugène Christophe	France	Armor	2	
22	Ernest Paul	France	Armor	DNF	
23	Jean Alavoine	France	Armor	5	
24	Charles Cruchon	France	Armor	DNF	
25	Robert Lamon	Belgium	Armor	DNF	
26	Joseph Van Daele	Belgium	JB Louvet	DNF	
27	Alfons Spiessens	Belgium	JB Louvet	10	
28	Édouard Léonard	France	JB Louvet	23	
29	Vincenzo Borgarello	Italy	JB Louvet	13	
30	Pierino Albini	Italy	JB Louvet	DNF	
31	François Faber	Luxembourg	Automoto–Persan	14	
32	Eugène Dhers	France	Automoto–Persan	24	
33	Maurice Leturgie	France	Automoto–Persan	DNF	
34	Constant Niedergang	France	Automoto–Persan	DNF	
35	Julien Maitron	France	Automoto–Persan	27	
36	Henri Cornet	France	Le Globe–Russian	28	
37	Albert Dupont	Belgium	Le Globe–Russian	DNF	
38	Pierre-Joseph Heusghem	Belgium	Le Globe–Russian	25	
39	Firmin Lambot	Belgium	Le Globe–Russian	18	
40	Henri Devroye	Belgium	Le Globe–Russian	8	
41	Louis Engel	France	Aiglon–Dunlop	15	
42	André Huret	France	Aiglon–Dunlop	DNF	
43	Robert Lefort	France	Aiglon–Dunlop	DNF	
44	Charles Kippert	France	Aiglon–Dunlop	DNF	
45	Charles Guyot	Switzerland	Aiglon–Dunlop	20	
46	Henri Pélissier	France	Thomann	DNF	
47	Louis Mottiat	Belgium	Thomann	DNF	
48	Jacques Coomans	Belgium	Thomann	17	
49	Alphonse Charpiot	France	Thomann	DNF	
50	René Vandenberghe	Belgium	Thomann	12	
101	Louis Poyet	Switzerland	Lone rider	DNF	
102	Maurice Leliaert	Belgium	Lone rider	31	
103	Benjamin Olivier	France	Lone rider	DNF	
104	Louis Delcampe	France	Lone rider	DNF	
105	Albert Dumas	France	Lone rider	DNF	
106	Henri Alavoine	France	Lone rider	38	
107	René Sal	France	Lone rider	DNF	
108	François Bertrand	France	Lone rider	DNF	
109	Ernest Tobler	France	Lone rider	DNF	
110	René Blandet	France	Lone rider	DNF	
113	André Thieullens	France	Lone rider	DNF	
116	Henri Yvon	France	Lone rider	DNF	
117	René Etien	France	Lone rider	DNF	
118	Auguste Bergerioux	France	Lone rider	DNF	
119	Edouard Aellig	Switzerland	Lone rider	DNF	
120	Camille Mathieu	France	Lone rider	DNF	
121	Luc Petitjean	Belgium	Lone rider	DNF	
122	Louis Petitjean	Belgium	Lone rider	DNF	
125	Albert Cartigny	France	Lone rider	DNF	
126	Jean Campanelli	France	Lone rider	DNF	
127	Fernand Courcelles	France	Lone rider	33	
128	François Van Hoofstadt	Belgium	Lone rider	DNF	
129	Roger Linon	France	Lone rider	DNF	
130	René Gerwig	France	Lone rider	DNF	
132	Louis Flamand	France	Lone rider	DNF	
133	Joanny Panel	France	Lone rider	DNF	
134	Louis Bonino	France	Lone rider	DNF	
135	Jean Mercier	Switzerland	Lone rider	DNF	
136	Raymond Harquet	France	Lone rider	34	
138	Octave Doury	France	Lone rider	DNF	
139	Paul Coppens	France	Lone rider	DNF	
141	Henri Murat	France	Lone rider	DNF	
143	Augustin Ringeval	France	Lone rider	30	
144	Raoul Grieux	France	Lone rider	DNF	
145	Emile Eigeldinger	France	Lone rider	36	
147	Lucien Cornu	France	Lone rider	DNF	
149	Achiel De Smet	Belgium	Lone rider	DNF	
150	Léon Vallotton	Switzerland	Lone rider	DNF	
151	Gaston Neboux	France	Lone rider	40	
152	Ernest Linot	France	Lone rider	DNF	
153	Albert Kohler	Switzerland	Lone rider	DNF	
154	Maurice Chedebois	France	Lone rider	DNF	
155	Moïse Fugere	France	Lone rider	DNF	
156	Jules Deloffre	France	Lone rider	21	
157	Louis Coolsaet	France	Lone rider	DNF	
159	Georges Oudin	France	Lone rider	32	
160	Giovanni Cocchi	Italy	Lone rider	DNF	
161	Enrico Sala	Italy	Lone rider	DNF	
162	Eduardo Cuchetti	Italy	Lone rider	DNF	
163	Emilio Roscio	Italy	Lone rider	DNF	
164	Luigi Gorret	Italy	Lone rider	DNF	
165	Ferdinand Payan	France	Lone rider	DNF	
166	Pierre Everaerts	Belgium	Lone rider	26	
167	Francis Gandel	France	Lone rider	DNF	
169	François Lafourcade	France	Lone rider	29	
170	Henri Menager	France	Lone rider	DNF	
171	Emile Reux	France	Lone rider	DNF	
172	François D’Haen	Belgium	Lone rider	DNF	
173	Lucien Delaygue	France	Lone rider	DNF	
174	Adolphe Dorion	France	Lone rider	DNF	
175	Emile Lachaise	France	Lone rider	DNF	
176	Georges Devilly	France	Lone rider	DNF	
177	Emile Druz	France	Lone rider	35	
178	Henri Leclerc	France	Lone rider	DNF	
179	Constant Collet	France	Lone rider	DNF	
181	Henri Serverin	France	Lone rider	DNF	
185	Marcel Rottie	France	Lone rider	DNF	
186	Maurice Borel	France	Lone rider	DNF	
187	Jules Quinardt	France	Lone rider	DNF	
188	Ugo Agostoni	Italy	Lone rider	DNF	
189	Emile Caudrelier	France	Lone rider	39	
190	Jean Perruca	Switzerland	Lone rider	DNF	
191	Vincent D’Hulst	France	Lone rider	DNF	
192	Henri Hanlet	Belgium	Lone rider	DNF	
193	Auguste Benoît	Belgium	Lone rider	DNF	
197	Antoine Fauré	France	Lone rider	DNF	
198	Ottavio Pratesi	Italy	Lone rider	19	
199	Maurice Lartigue	France	Lone rider	41	
200	Victor Cathera	France	Lone rider	DNF	
202	Charles Dumont	Switzerland	Lone rider	37	
203	V. Schwarshampt	France	Lone rider	DNF	
