= 1911 Tour de France, Stage 9 to Stage 15 =

Cycling race stages

Route of the 1911 Tour de France

The 1911 Tour de France was the 9th edition of Tour de France, one of cycling's Grand Tours. The Tour began in Paris on 2 July and Stage 9 occurred on 18 July with a mountainous stage from Perpignan. The race finished in Paris on 30 July.

== Stage 9 ==
18 July 1911 — Perpignan to Luchon, 289 km (180 mi)

Stage 9 result

Rank	Rider	Team	Time
1	Paul Duboc (FRA)	La Française	11h 10' 00"
2	Émile Georget (FRA)	La Française	+ 2' 00"
3	Marcel Godivier (FRA)	La Française	s.t.
4	Gustave Garrigou (FRA)	Alcyon-Dunlop	+ 3' 00"
5	Albert Dupont (BEL)	Le Globe	+ 15' 00"
6	Firmin Lambot (BEL)	Le Globe	+ 20' 00"
7	Charles Cruchon (FRA)	La Française	+ 26' 00"
8	Henri Cornet (FRA)	Le Globe	+ 30' 00"
9	Henri Devroye (BEL)	Le Globe	+ 31' 00"
10	Louis Heusghem (BEL)	Alcyon-Dunlop	+ 36' 00"

General classification after stage 9

Rank	Rider	Team	Points
1	Gustave Garrigou (FRA)	Alcyon-Dunlop	27
2	Paul Duboc (FRA)	La Française	37
3	François Faber (LUX)	Alcyon-Dunlop	59
4			
5			
6			
7			
8			
9			
10			

== Stage 10 ==
20 July 1911 — Luchon to Bayonne, 326 km (202.6 mi)

Stage 10 result

Rank	Rider	Team	Time
1	Maurice Brocco (FRA)	Alcyon-Dunlop	13h 26' 00"
2	Gustave Garrigou (FRA)	Alcyon-Dunlop	+ 34' 00"
3	Émile Georget (FRA)	La Française	+ 37' 00"
4	Ernest Paul (FRA)	Alcyon-Dunlop	s.t.
5	Charles Crupelandt (FRA)	La Française	+ 43' 00"
6	Henri Devroye (BEL)	Le Globe	+ 58' 00"
7	Firmin Lambot (BEL)	Le Globe	s.t.
8	François Faber (LUX)	Alcyon-Dunlop	+ 1h 15' 00"
9	Ottavio Pratesi (ITA)	Lone rider	+ 1h 45' 00"
10	Louis Heusghem (BEL)	Alcyon-Dunlop	+ 1h 59' 00"

General classification after stage 10

Rank	Rider	Team	Points
1	Gustave Garrigou (FRA)	Alcyon-Dunlop	28
2	Paul Duboc (FRA)	La Française	54
3	François Faber (LUX)	Alcyon-Dunlop	64
4			
5			
6			
7			
8			
9			
10			

== Stage 11 ==
22 July 1911 — Bayonne to La Rochelle, 379 km (235 mi)

Stage 11 result

Rank	Rider	Team	Time
1	Paul Duboc (FRA)	La Française	12h 58' 00"
2	Émile Georget (FRA)	La Française	+ 12' 00"
3	Charles Crupelandt (FRA)	La Française	+ 39' 00"
4	Gustave Garrigou (FRA)	Alcyon-Dunlop	+ 52' 00"
5	Marcel Godivier (FRA)	La Française	s.t.
6	Jules Deloffre (FRA)	Lone rider	+ 58' 00"
7	Albert Dupont (BEL)	Le Globe	+ 1h 05' 00"
8	Georges Paulmier (FRA)	Automoto	+ 1h 10' 00"
9	François Faber (LUX)	Alcyon-Dunlop	+ 1h 14' 00"
10	Ernest Paul (FRA)	Alcyon-Dunlop	s.t.

General classification after stage 11

Rank	Rider	Team	Points
1	Gustave Garrigou (FRA)	Alcyon-Dunlop	32
2	Paul Duboc (FRA)	La Française	55
3	Émile Georget (FRA)	La Française	72
4			
5			
6			
7			
8			
9			
10			

== Stage 12 ==
23 July 1911 — La Rochelle to Brest, 470 km (290 mi)

Stage 12 result

Rank	Rider	Team	Time
1	Marcel Godivier (FRA)	La Française	17h 40' 00"
2	Julien Maitron (FRA)	La Française	+ 28' 00"
3	Charles Cruchon (FRA)	La Française	+ 35' 00"
4	Émile Georget (FRA)	La Française	+ 50' 00"
5	Alfred Faure (FRA)	Automoto	s.t.
6	Paul Duboc (FRA)	La Française	+ 54' 00"
7	Gustave Garrigou (FRA)	Alcyon-Dunlop	s.t.
8	Charles Crupelandt (FRA)	La Française	+ 1h 14' 00"
9	Henri Cornet (FRA)	Le Globe	+ 1h 30' 00"
10	Jules Deloffre (FRA)	Lone rider	s.t.

General classification after stage 12

Rank	Rider	Team	Points
1	Gustave Garrigou (FRA)	Alcyon-Dunlop	35
2	Paul Duboc (FRA)	La Française	60
3	Émile Georget (FRA)	La Française	74
4			
5			
6			
7			
8			
9			
10			

== Stage 13 ==
26 July 1911 — Brest to Cherbourg-en-Cotentin, 405 km (252 mi)

Stage 13 result

Rank	Rider	Team	Time
1	Gustave Garrigou (FRA)	Alcyon-Dunlop	13h 44' 00"
2	Henri Cornet (FRA)	Le Globe	s.t.
3	Albert Dupont (BEL)	Le Globe	s.t.
4	Constant Ménager (FRA)	Le Globe	s.t.
5	Charles Cruchon (FRA)	La Française	+ 10' 00"
6	Ernest Paul (FRA)	Alcyon-Dunlop	s.t.
7	Paul Duboc (FRA)	La Française	+ 20' 00"
8	Georges Paulmier (FRA)	Automoto	+ 1h 10' 00"
9	Émile Georget (FRA)	La Française	+ 1h 16' 00"
10	Alfred-Faure (FRA)	Automoto	+ 1h 18' 00"

General classification after stage 13

Rank	Rider	Team	Points
1	Gustave Garrigou (FRA)	Alcyon-Dunlop	36
2	Paul Duboc (FRA)	La Française	67
3	Émile Georget (FRA)	La Française	83
4			
5			
6			
7			
8			
9			
10			

== Stage 14 ==
28 July 1911 — Cherbourg-en-Cotentin to Le Havre, 361 km (224 mi)

Stage 14 result

Rank	Rider	Team	Time
1	Paul Duboc (FRA)	La Française	12h 01' 00"
2	Émile Georget (FRA)	La Française	s.t.
3	Charles Crupelandt (FRA)	La Française	+ 15' 00"
4	Charles Cruchon (FRA)	La Française	s.t.
5	Gustave Garrigou (FRA)	Alcyon-Dunlop	+ 40' 00"
6	Marcel Godivier (FRA)	La Française	s.t.
7	Firmin Lambot (BEL)	Le Globe	s.t.
8	Henri Devroye (BEL)	Le Globe	s.t.
9	Ottavio Pratesi (ITA)	Lone rider	+ 47' 00"
10	Ernest Paul (FRA)	Alcyon-Dunlop	+ 58' 00"

General classification after stage 14

Rank	Rider	Team	Points
1	Gustave Garrigou (FRA)	Alcyon-Dunlop	41
2	Paul Duboc (FRA)	La Française	68
3	Émile Georget (FRA)	La Française	85
4			
5			
6			
7			
8			
9			
10			

== Stage 15 ==
30 July 1911 — Le Havre to Paris, 317 km (197 mi)

Stage 15 result

Rank	Rider	Team	Time
1	Marcel Godivier (FRA)	La Française	10h 49' 00"
2	Paul Duboc (FRA)	La Française	+ 2' 00"
3	Gustave Garrigou (FRA)	Alcyon-Dunlop	+ 29' 00"
4	Charles Cruchon (FRA)	La Française	+ 30' 00"
5	Jules Deloffre (FRA)	Lone rider	+ 31' 00"
6	Albert Dupont (BEL)	Le Globe	+ 36' 00"
7	Henri Cornet (FRA)	Le Globe	+ 39' 00"
8	Charles Crupelandt (FRA)	La Française	+ 40' 00"
9	Ernest Paul (FRA)	Alcyon-Dunlop	+ 40' 30"
10	Henri Devroye (BEL)	Le Globe	+ 47' 00"

General classification after stage 15

Rank	Rider	Team	Points
1	Gustave Garrigou (FRA)	Alcyon-Dunlop	41
2	Paul Duboc (FRA)	La Française	68
3	Émile Georget (FRA)	La Française	85
4	Charles Crupelandt (FRA)	La Française	109
5	Louis Heusghem (BEL)	Alcyon-Dunlop	135
6	Marcel Godivier (FRA)	La Française	141
7	Charles Cruchon (FRA)	La Française	145
8	Ernest Paul (FRA)	Alcyon-Dunlop	153
9	Albert Dupont (BEL)	Le Globe	158
10	Henri Devroye (BEL)	Le Globe	171
