= 1911 Tour de France, Stage 1 to Stage 8 =

Cycling race stages

Route of the 1911 Tour de France

The 1911 Tour de France was the 9th edition of Tour de France, one of cycling's Grand Tours. The Tour began in Paris on 2 July and Stage 8 occurred on 16 July with a flat stage to Perpignan. The race finished in Paris on 30 July.

== Stage 1 ==
2 July 1911 — Paris to Dunkerque, 351 km (218.1 mi)

Stage 1 result and general classification after stage 1

Rank	Rider	Team	Time
1	Gustave Garrigou (FRA)	Alcyon-Dunlop	12h 32' 00"
2	Jules Masselis (BEL)	Alcyon-Dunlop	s.t.
3	François Faber (LUX)	Alcyon	+ 15' 00"
4	Marcel Godivier (FRA)	La Française	+ 16' 00"
5	Georges Passerieu (FRA)	La Française	+ 30' 00"
6	Paul Duboc (FRA)	La Française	+ 34' 00"
7	Louis Heusghem (BEL)	Alcyon-Dunlop	s.t.
8	Louis Trousselier (FRA)	Alcyon-Dunlop	+ 35' 00"
9	André Blaise (FRA)	Alcyon-Dunlop	s.t.
10	René Vandenberghe (BEL)	Alcyon-Dunlop	+ 39' 00"

== Stage 2 ==
4 July 1911 — Dunkerque to Longwy, 388 km (241.1 mi)

Stage 2 result

Rank	Rider	Team	Time
1	Jules Masselis (BEL)	Alcyon-Dunlop	13h 30' 00"
2	François Faber (LUX)	Alcyon-Dunlop	s.t.
3	Gustave Garrigou (FRA)	Alcyon-Dunlop	s.t.
4	Émile Georget (FRA)	La Française	s.t.
5	Marcel Godivier (FRA)	La Française	+ 3' 00"
6	Octave Lapize (FRA)	La Française	+ 4' 00"
7	Paul Duboc (FRA)	La Française	+ 5' 00"
8	Charles Crupelandt (FRA)	La Française	+ 8' 00"
9	Louis Heusghem (BEL)	Alcyon-Dunlop	+ 20' 00"
10	Georges Paulmier (FRA)	Automoto	s.t.

General classification after stage 2

Rank	Rider	Team	Points
1	Jules Masselis (BEL)	Alcyon-Dunlop	3
2	Gustave Garrigou (FRA)	Alcyon-Dunlop	4
3	François Faber (LUX)	Alcyon-Dunlop	5
4			
5			
6			
7			
8			
9			
10			

== Stage 3 ==
6 July 1911 — Longwy to Belfort, 331 km (206 mi)

Stage 3 result

Rank	Rider	Team	Time
1	François Faber (LUX)	Alcyon-Dunlop	10h 50' 00"
2	Marcel Godivier (FRA)	La Française	+ 17' 00"
3	Gustave Garrigou (FRA)	Alcyon-Dunlop	+ 19' 00"
4	Paul Duboc (FRA)	La Française	+ 21' 00"
5	Georges Paulmier (FRA)	Automoto	+ 32' 00"
6	Charles Cruchon (FRA)	La Française	+ 33' 00"
7	Charles Crupelandt (FRA)	La Française	+ 37' 00"
8	Jules Masselis (BEL)	Alcyon-Dunlop	+ 40' 00"
9	Louis Heusghem (BEL)	Alcyon-Dunlop	+ 47' 00"
10	Octave Lapize (FRA)	La Française	+ 49' 00"

General classification after stage 3

Rank	Rider	Team	Points
1	François Faber (LUX)	Alcyon-Dunlop	6
2	Gustave Garrigou (FRA)	Alcyon-Dunlop	7
3	Jules Masselis (BEL)	Alcyon-Dunlop	11
4			
5			
6			
7			
8			
9			
10			

== Stage 4 ==
8 July 1911 — Belfort to Chamonix, 344 km (214 mi)

Stage 4 result

Rank	Rider	Team	Time
1	Charles Crupelandt (FRA)	La Française	11h 46' 00"
2	Louis Heusghem (BEL)	Alcyon-Dunlop	+ 1' 00"
3	Gustave Garrigou (FRA)	Alcyon-Dunlop	+ 6' 00"
4	Émile Georget (FRA)	La Française	+ 7' 00"
5	François Faber (LUX)	Alcyon-Dunlop	+ 16' 00"
6	Firmin Lambot (BEL)	Le Globe	+ 19' 00"
7	Albert Dupont (BEL)	Le Globe	+ 20' 00"
8	Paul Duboc (FRA)	La Française	+ 21' 00"
9	Ernest Paul (FRA)	Alcyon-Dunlop	+ 26' 00"
10	Jules Nempon (FRA)	Le Globe	+ 27' 00"

General classification after stage 4

Rank	Rider	Team	Points
1	Gustave Garrigou (FRA)	Alcyon-Dunlop	10
2	François Faber (LUX)	Alcyon-Dunlop	11
3	Paul Duboc (FRA)	La Française	25
4			
5			
6			
7			
8			
9			
10			

== Stage 5 ==
10 July 1911 — Chamonix to Grenoble, 366 km (227 mi)

Stage 5 result

Rank	Rider	Team	Time
1	Émile Georget (FRA)	La Française	13h 35' 00"
2	Paul Duboc (FRA)	La Française	+ 15' 00"
3	Gustave Garrigou (FRA)	Alcyon-Dunlop	+ 26' 00"
4	Ernest Paul (FRA)	Alcyon-Dunlop	+ 31' 00"
5	Jules Nempon (FRA)	Le Globe	+ 47' 00"
6	Louis Heusghem (BEL)	Alcyon-Dunlop	+ 1h 01' 00"
7	Charles Crupelandt (FRA)	La Française	+ 1h 08' 00"
8	Charles Cruchon (FRA)	La Française	+ 1h 10' 00"
9	François Lafourcade (FRA)	Automoto	+ 1h 25' 00"
10	Firmin Lambot (BEL)	Le Globe	+ 1h 29' 00"

General classification after stage 5

Rank	Rider	Team	Points
1	Gustave Garrigou (FRA)	Alcyon-Dunlop	13
2	François Faber (LUX)	Alcyon-Dunlop	23
3	Paul Duboc (FRA)	La Française	27
4			
5			
6			
7			
8			
9			
10			

== Stage 6 ==
12 July 1911 — Grenoble to Nice, 348 km (216 mi)

Stage 6 result

Rank	Rider	Team	Time
1	François Faber (LUX)	Alcyon-Dunlop	13h 17' 00"
2	Gustave Garrigou (FRA)	Alcyon-Dunlop	+ 10' 00"
3	Charles Crupelandt (FRA)	La Française	s.t.
4	Paul Duboc (FRA)	La Française	+ 20' 00"
5	Ernest Paul (FRA)	Alcyon-Dunlop	s.t.
6	Jules Nempon (FRA)	Le Globe	+ 22' 00"
7	Albert Dupont (BEL)	Le Globe	+ 49' 00"
8	Émile Georget (FRA)	La Française	+ 50' 00"
9	Henri Cornet (FRA)	Le Globe	+ 1h 18' 00"
10	Louis Heusghem (BEL)	Alcyon-Dunlop	s.t.

General classification after stage 6

Rank	Rider	Team	Points
1	Gustave Garrigou (FRA)	Alcyon-Dunlop	15
2	François Faber (LUX)	Alcyon-Dunlop	24
3	Paul Duboc (FRA)	La Française	31
4			
5			
6			
7			
8			
9			
10			

== Stage 7 ==
14 July 1911 — Nice to Marseille, 334 km (208 mi)

Stage 7 result

Rank	Rider	Team	Time
1	Charles Crupelandt (FRA)	La Française	12h 14' 00"
2	Émile Georget (FRA)	La Française	s.t.
3	Jules Nempon (FRA)	Le Globe	+ 10' 00"
4	Paul Duboc (FRA)	La Française	+ 30' 00"
5	Gustave Garrigou (FRA)	Alcyon-Dunlop	s.t.
6	Albert Dupont (BEL)	Le Globe	+ 47' 00"
7	François Faber (LUX)	Alcyon-Dunlop	+ 50' 00"
8	Charles Cruchon (FRA)	La Française	s.t.
9	Henri Devroye (FRA)	Le Globe	s.t.
10	Louis Heusghem (BEL)	Alcyon-Dunlop	+ 1h 00' 00"

General classification after stage 7

Rank	Rider	Team	Points
1	Gustave Garrigou (FRA)	Alcyon-Dunlop	20
2	François Faber (LUX)	Alcyon-Dunlop	31
3	Paul Duboc (FRA)	La Française	35
4			
5			
6			
7			
8			
9			
10			

== Stage 8 ==
16 July 1911 — Marseille to Perpignan, 335 km (208.2 mi)

Stage 8 result

Rank	Rider	Team	Time
1	Paul Duboc (FRA)	La Française	11h 04' 00"
2	Louis Heusghem (BEL)	Alcyon-Dunlop	+ 5' 00"
3	Gustave Garrigou (FRA)	Alcyon-Dunlop	+ 8' 00"
4	Émile Georget (FRA)	La Française	+ 10' 00"
5	Albert Dupont (BEL)	Le Globe	s.t.
6	Charles Crupelandt (FRA)	La Française	+ 11' 00"
7	Charles Cruchon (FRA)	La Française	+ 13' 00"
8	François Faber (LUX)	Alcyon-Dunlop	+ 14' 00"
9	Maurice Brocco (FRA)	Alcyon-Dunlop	+ 15' 00"
10	Marcel Godivier (FRA)	La Française	+ 46' 00"

General classification after stage 8

Rank	Rider	Team	Points
1	Gustave Garrigou (FRA)	Alcyon-Dunlop	23
2	Paul Duboc (FRA)	La Française	36
3	François Faber (LUX)	Alcyon-Dunlop	39
4			
5			
6			
7			
8			
9			
10			
