= 1912 Milan–San Remo =

Race details
- Dates: 31 March 1912
- Stages: 1
- Distance: 289.7 km (180.0 mi)
- Winning time: 9h 44' 30"

Results
	Winner	Henri Pélissier (FRA)
	Second	Gustave Garrigou (FRA)
	Third	Jules Masselis (BEL)

The 1912 Milan–San Remo was the sixth edition of the Milan–San Remo cycle race and was held on 31 March 1912. The race started in Milan and finished in San Remo. The race was won by Henri Pélissier.

== General classification ==
Final general classification

Rank	Rider	Time
1	Henri Pélissier (FRA)	9h 44' 30"
2	Gustave Garrigou (FRA)	+ 0"
3	Jules Masselis (BEL)	+ 0"
4	Ezio Corlaita (ITA)	+ 0"
5	André Blaise (BEL)	+ 0"
6	Dario Beni (ITA)	+ 1' 45"
7	Louis Heusghem (BEL)	+ 1' 45"
8	Carlo Durando (ITA)	+ 1' 45"
9	Leopold Toricelli (ITA)	+ 1' 45"
10	Carlo Galetti (ITA)	+ 1' 45"
