= 1911 Tour de France =

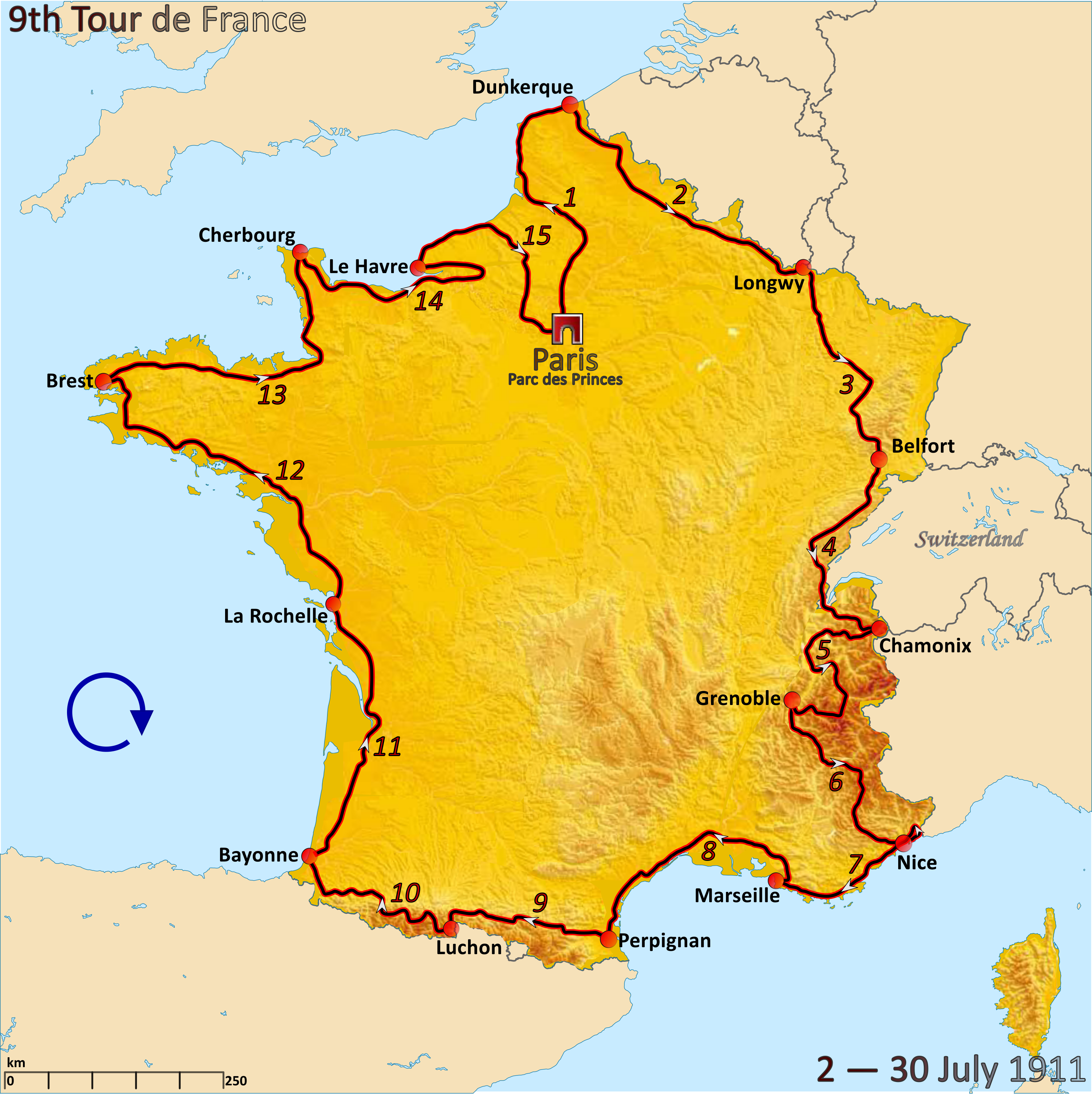
- Route of the 1911 Tour de France followed clockwise, starting in Paris

Race details
- Dates: 2–30 July 1911
- Stages: 15
- Distance: 5,343 km (3,320 mi)
- Winning time: 43 points

Results
	Winner	Gustave Garrigou (FRA)
	Second	Paul Duboc (FRA)
	Third	Émile Georget (FRA)

The 1911 Tour de France was the ninth edition of the Tour de France, taking place from 2 to 30 July. It was composed of 15 stages over 5,343 kilometres (3,320 mi), ridden at an average speed of 27.322 km/h. The results were computed by giving each rider points according to his finishing position on each stage, and the rider with the fewest points at the end of the race won the overall competition. It was a gruelling tour, with the longest stage, 470 km long, taking almost 18 hours for the fastest riders to complete. Out of the 84 riders who started the tour, only 28 completed the race. After the introduction of the Pyrenees in the previous edition, in 1911 the Alps were first visited; for this addition, the 1911 edition has been named the first modern Tour.

Newcomer Paul Duboc won four stages and was close to winning the Tour, but he fell sick midway through the race while he was in second place in the general classification. The winner was Gustave Garrigou, who also won two stages.

== Innovations and changes ==
In 1910, the Tour de France included the Pyrenees mountains for the first time. That was a success, so in 1911, the Tour organisers also included the Alps. The favourite mountain of the Tour organiser Henri Desgrange was the Col du Galibier, about which he wrote "O, col Bayard, O, Tourmalet... next to Galibier you are worthless." During the 1910 Tour, cyclists had protested against the inclusion of high mountains, but at the 1911 Tour, all important cyclists were present.

What did not change was the points system; similar to the 1905–1910 Tours, this race was decided on points. A cyclist received points, based on their rankings. As in 1910, the points system was "cleaned up" two times: after the ninth stage and after the 14th stage. Cyclists who had abandoned the race were removed from the rankings of the previous stages, and the classification was recalculated.

Since 1906, the Tour de France had crossed the German border into Alsace-Lorraine. After 1910, the German authorities did not allow this any more, so the Tour stayed in France.

== Teams ==
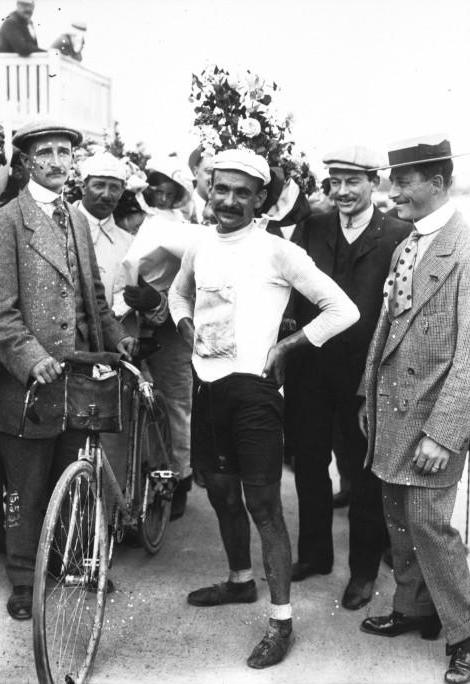
Gustave Garrigou after winning the race.

As in the year before, there were two categories of riders. The best riders started in sponsored teams; there were four different teams, with 37 riders in total. The stages had checkpoints where riders had to sign, and on these checkpoints, the sponsored riders were allowed to be given food and drinks. The other category consisted of 47 isolated riders; they were not allowed to be given food or drinks during these checkpoints.

The previous edition had been a close battle between teammates Octave Lapize and François Faber from the Alcyon team, won by Lapize. Lapize had changed teams to the La Française team, where he was joined by former winner Lucien Petit-Breton (winner in 1907 and 1908). Petit-Breton was a late replacement for Cyrille van Hauwaert, who was not feeling healthy enough to ride the Tour.

== Race overview ==
The first stage was won by Garrigou, a teammate of Faber at Alcyon. In that first stage, Petit-Breton had to leave the race after a series of unfortunate events. The Alcyon team also won the second stage with Masselis. The third stage was won by Faber, after a 206 km solitary breakaway. During that stage, Émile Georget was leading when he was hit by a car and fell down a ravine. In the same stage, Faber had passed a checkpoint without signing, and as a penalty he had to stop for two and a half minutes. Despite this, he still won with an advantage of 17 minutes, and took the lead in the general classification.

In the fourth stage, Garrigou took back the lead from his teammate Faber. At that point, Faber became insecure, as he knew that Garrigou was a good climber, while the big Faber had troubles in the mountains. In the alps, Georget was the best. Garrigou finished well before Faber, and was now leading by 10 points. The sixth stage, with only small mountains, was won by Faber, after a 260 km solitary breakaway, but because Garrigou came in second, he was still in the lead. In third place was Paul Duboc, a surprising newcomer.

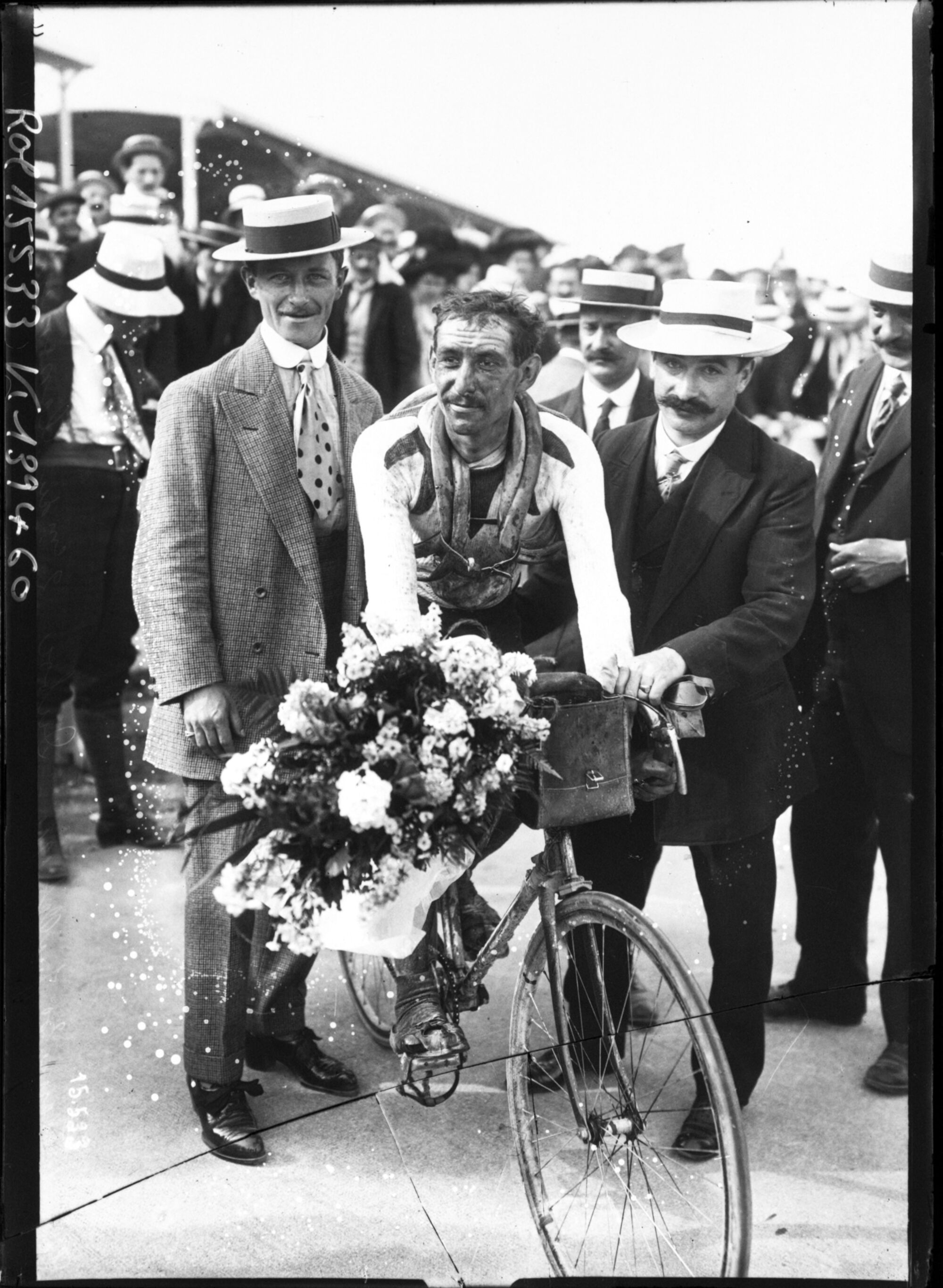
Paul Duboc finished second overall.

Duboc was the strongest in the eighth stage, and after his stage victory, he was in second place in the general classification. In the ninth stage, Faber lost contact with Garrigou in the general classification by finishing in twentieth place. Duboc won again, and had shown that he was a good climber, and was considered a favourite for the tenth stage which also included mountains, and a serious threat for Garrigou in the general classification; after this stage, Garrigou was leading with 27 points, while Duboc had 37 points. In that ninth stage, Maurice Brocco who knew that he would not win the Tour, had sold his services to another cyclist. He was removed from the race by Tour organiser Desgrange, who was against cyclists helping each other. Brocco objected against this decision, and pending the decision he was allowed to start the tenth stage from Luchon to Bayonne. In that tenth stage, Brocco attacked and finished first. After the stage, his appeal was rejected and he was removed from the race. Also in the tenth stage, Duboc collapsed just before Bayonne, probably due to food poisoning, attributed to a spiked drink. At that moment, he was leading the stage, eight minutes before the next cyclist. According to the rules, no help was allowed, so other cyclists rode by him while he was lying on the road, vomiting. Duboc was able to get on his bicycle again, and finished the stage in 21st place, which left him no hopes for the victory. Nowadays, it is thought that François Lafourcade, a cyclist who performed well in the mountains of the 1910 Tour had something to do with it, but in 1911, the first suspect was his main competitor Garrigou. Garrigou was threatened, and the Tour organisation gave him a bodyguard, and when the Tour passed Duboc's home town, Garrigou was disguised.

Duboc regained his strengths and won two more stages, but was unable to close the gap to Garrigou in the general classification, so Garrigou became the winner of the race. At the end of the race in Paris, Duboc received a large welcome, overshadowing Garrigou. The pre-race favourites had already abandoned early in the race — 1907 and 1908 winner Petit-Breton in the first stage and 1910 winner Lapize in stage four. The winner from 1909, Faber, lasted longer, but he gave up during stage twelve.

== Results ==
=== Stage winners ===
Stage characteristics and winners
Stage	Date	Course	Distance	Type (Note: In 1911, there was no distinction in the rules between plain stages and mountain stages; the icons shown here indicate which stages included mountains.)	Winner	Race leader
1	2 July	Paris to Dunkerque	351 km (218 mi)	Plain stage	Gustave Garrigou (FRA)	Gustave Garrigou (FRA)
2	4 July	Dunkerque to Longwy	388 km (241 mi)	Plain stage	Jules Masselis (BEL)	Jules Masselis (BEL)
3	6 July	Longwy to Belfort	331 km (206 mi)	Stage with mountain(s)	François Faber (LUX)	François Faber (LUX)
4	8 July	Belfort to Chamonix	344 km (214 mi)	Stage with mountain(s)	Charles Crupelandt (FRA)	Gustave Garrigou (FRA)
5	10 July	Chamonix to Grenoble	366 km (227 mi)	Stage with mountain(s)	Émile Georget (FRA)	Gustave Garrigou (FRA)
6	12 July	Grenoble to Nice	348 km (216 mi)	Stage with mountain(s)	François Faber (LUX)	Gustave Garrigou (FRA)
7	14 July	Nice to Marseille	334 km (208 mi)	Stage with mountain(s)	Charles Crupelandt (FRA)	Gustave Garrigou (FRA)
8	16 July	Marseille to Perpignan	335 km (208 mi)	Plain stage	Paul Duboc (FRA)	Gustave Garrigou (FRA)
9	18 July	Perpignan to Luchon	289 km (180 mi)	Stage with mountain(s)	Paul Duboc (FRA)	Gustave Garrigou (FRA)
10	20 July	Luchon to Bayonne	326 km (203 mi)	Stage with mountain(s)	Maurice Brocco (FRA)	Gustave Garrigou (FRA)
11	22 July	Bayonne to La Rochelle	379 km (235 mi)	Plain stage	Paul Duboc (FRA)	Gustave Garrigou (FRA)
12	23 July	La Rochelle to Brest	470 km (290 mi)	Plain stage	Marcel Godivier (FRA)	Gustave Garrigou (FRA)
13	26 July	Brest to Cherbourg-en-Cotentin	405 km (252 mi)	Plain stage	Gustave Garrigou (FRA)	Gustave Garrigou (FRA)
14	28 July	Cherbourg to Le Havre	361 km (224 mi)	Plain stage	Paul Duboc (FRA)	Gustave Garrigou (FRA)
15	30 July	Le Havre to Paris	317 km (197 mi)	Plain stage	Marcel Godivier (FRA)	Gustave Garrigou (FRA)
	Total		5,343 km (3,320 mi)			

=== General classification ===
Of the 84 starting cyclists, 28 finished. The winner, Gustave Garrigou, received 5000 francs for his victory.

Final general classification (1–10)
Rank	Rider	Team	Points
1	Gustave Garrigou (FRA)	Alcyon	43
2	Paul Duboc (FRA)	La Française	61
3	Émile Georget (FRA)	La Française	84
4	Charles Crupelandt (FRA)	La Française	109
5	Louis Heusghem (BEL)	Alcyon	135
6	Marcel Godivier (FRA)	La Française	141
7	Charles Cruchon (FRA)	La Française	145
8	Ernest Paul (FRA)	Alcyon	153
9	Albert Dupont (BEL)	Le Globe	158
10	Henri Devroye (BEL)	Le Globe	171

Final general classification (11–28)
Rank	Rider	Sponsor	Points
11	Firmin Lambot (BEL)	Le Globe	178
12	Henri Cornet (FRA)	Le Globe	190
13	Paul Deman (BEL)	–	198
14	Julien Maitron (FRA)	La Française	216
15	Jules Deloffre (FRA)	–	218
16	Georges Paulmier (FRA)	Automoto	227
17	Ottavio Pratesi (ITA)	–	251
18	Vincent D'Hulst (FRA)	–	253
19	Alfred Faure (FRA)	Automoto	256
20	Lucien Pothier (FRA)	Le Globe	284
21	Édouard Léonard (FRA)	Automoto	288
22	Constant Ménager (FRA)	Le Globe	291
23	Maurice Pardon (FRA)	Le Globe	291
24	Louis Coolsaet (BEL)	–	300
25	Marius Vilette (FRA)	–	329
26	Ernest Ricaux (FRA)	Automoto	351
27	Pietro Ghislotti (ITA)	–	377
28	Lucien Roquebert (FRA)	–	392

=== Other classifications ===
Thirteenth-placed Paul Deman became the winner of the "isolés" category. The organising newspaper l'Auto named Paul Duboc the meilleur grimpeur. This unofficial title is the precursor to the mountains classification.

== Bibliography ==
- Amels, Wim (1984). De geschiedenis van de Tour de France 1903–1984 (in Dutch). Valkenswaard, Netherlands: Sport-Express. ISBN 978-90-70763-05-3.
- Augendre, Jacques (2016). Guide historique [Historical guide] (PDF) (in French). Paris: Amaury Sport Organisation. Archived (PDF) from the original on 17 August 2016.
- Cleijne, Jan (2014). Legends of the Tour. London: Head of Zeus. ISBN 978-1-78185-998-8.
- McGann, Bill; McGann, Carol (2006). The Story of the Tour de France: 1903–1964. Vol. 1. Indianapolis: Dog Ear Publishing. ISBN 978-1-59858-180-5.
- Thompson, Christopher S. (2006). The Tour de France: A Cultural History. Oakland, California: University of California Press. ISBN 978-0-520-24760-4.
