= 1907 Giro di Lombardia =

Race details
- Dates: 3 November 1907
- Stages: 1
- Distance: 210 km (130.5 mi)
- Winning time: 7h 53' 41"

Results
	Winner	Gustave Garrigou (FRA)	(Peugeot–Wolber)
	Second	Ernesto Azzini (ITA)	(Atena)
	Third	Luigi Ganna (ITA)	(Turkheimer)

The 1907 Giro di Lombardia was the third edition of the Giro di Lombardia cycle race and was held on 3 November 1907. The race started in Milan and finished in Sesto San Giovanni. The race was won by Gustave Garrigou of the Peugeot team.

== General classification ==
Final general classification

Rank	Rider	Team	Time
1	Gustave Garrigou (FRA)	Peugeot–Wolber	7h 53' 41"
2	Ernesto Azzini (ITA)	Atena	+ 12' 23"
3	Luigi Ganna (ITA)	Turkheimer	+ 18' 49"
4	Felice Gallazzi (ITA)	Individual	+ 24' 30"
5	Andrea Massironi (ITA)	Individual	+ 29' 25"
6	Henri Rheinwald (SUI)	Individual	+ 42' 16"
7	Ernesto Ferrari (ITA)	Individual	+ 42' 16"
8	Ferrucio Mirancelli (ITA)	Individual	+ 42' 17"
9	Mario Gaioni (ITA)	Individual	+ 42' 17"
10	Attilio Alberti (ITA)	Individual	+ 55' 19"
