= Roquebert =

Roquebert is a French surname. Notable people with the surname include:

- Dominique Roquebert (1744–1811), French Navy officer
- Lucien Roquebert (1890–1970), French cyclist
