= Mario Gaioni =

Italian cyclist (1880–1946)

Personal information
- Born: 20 November 1880 Milan, Italy
- Died: 9 December 1946 (aged 66)

Cycling career
- Sport: Cycling
- Discipline: Road
- Role: Rider

Professional teams
- 1905–1906: Bianchi
- 1909: Legnano–Pirelli
- 1909-1910: Stucchi

Major wins
- Erba–Lurago–Erba (1905)

Mario Gaioni, also written as Mario Gajoni, (20 November 1880 – 9 December 1946) was an Italian professional road racing cyclist during the 1900s and early 1910s. He won the Erba–Lurago–Erba race in 1905, set a record for the "Giro d'Italia" in 1907 and finished 14th overall in the 1909 Tour de France.

== Biography ==
Born in Milan in 1880, Gaioni began competing in major Italian road races with Bianchi in 1905. That season he won the Erba-Lurago-Erba race and finished runner-up in the Corza Nazionale and sixth in the cycling classic Milano–Torino.

In 1906 he placed fourth in the cycling monument Giro di Lombardia and would have another top-10 finish the next year finishing ninth. That year he also had a podium finish in the 1907 Giro del Piemonte.

In December 1907, Gaioni set a new record for completing a Tour of Italy over a prescribed 2,500-kilometre (1,600 mi) route. Contemporary sources referred to the achievement as the "Giro d'Italia", although it predated the establishment of the Giro d'Italia stage race by two years. Riding unpaced on a Soriani bicycle fitted with Corona tyres, he departed Milan on 5 December and followed a route through Turin, Genoa, La Spezia, Parma, Bologna, Florence, Perugia, Rome, Foligno, Macerata, Ancona, Forlì, Ravenna, Ferrara, Padua, Vicenza, Verona and Brescia before returning to Milan. Despite encountering heavy rain and hail during the journey, he completed the ride on 16 December, lowering the previous record, held by Alberici, by two days.

Gaioni competed for Legnano–Pirelli in the 1909 Tour de France, riding as one of six members of the team. He finished 14th overall, the highest-placed rider from Legnano–Pirelli, and recorded a tenth-place finish on stage 12 from Nantes to Brest.

His final major appearance came in the 1911 Giro d'Italia, where he finished twenty-second overall.

== Major results ==
1905
1st Erba–Lurago–Erba
2nd Corza Nazionale
6th Milano–Torino

1906
4th Giro di Lombardia
6th Giro del Piemonte

1907
"Giro d'Italia" record broken
3rd Coppa Val d'Olona
3rd Giro del Piemonte
3rd Milano–Bergamo–Como
7th Italian National Road Race Championships
9th Giro di Lombardia

1909
14th Overall Tour de France

10th stage 12

=== Grand Tour and classic results timeline ===
| Grand Tour | 1905 | 1906 | 1907 | 1908 | 1909 | 1911 |
|---|---|---|---|---|---|---|
| Tour de France | — | — | — | — | 14th | — |
| Giro d'Italia | Not held | | | | — | 22nd |
| Monument | 1905 | 1906 | 1907 | 1908 | 1909 | 1911 |
| Milan–San Remo | Not held | | 11th | DNF | 26th | 33rd |
| Giro di Lombardia | — | 4th | 9th | — | — | — |
| Classic | 1905 | 1906 | 1907 | 1908 | 1909 | 1911 |
| Milano–Torino | 6th | Not held | | | | — |
| Giro del Piemonte | Not held | 6th | 3rd | — | Not held | — |
