= Carlo Mairani =

Italian cyclist (1883–1959)

Personal information
- Born: 16 February 1883 Milan, Lombardy, Kingdom of Italy
- Died: 18 July 1959 (aged 76) Vigevano, Lombardy, Italy

Cycling career
- Sport: Cycling

Professional teams
- 1905: Individual
- 1906: Individual
- 1908: Individual
- 1909: S.C. Milanese

Carlo Mairani (16 February 1883 – 18 July 1959) was an Italian professional road racing cyclist. He competed in the 1905 Giro di Lombardia, 1906 Giro di Lombardia and 1908 Giro di Lombardia

== Major results ==
- 1905
  - 5th Giro di Lombardia
- 1906
  - 8th Giro di Lombardia
- 1908
  - 4th Giro di Lombardia
