= Brussels Cycling Classic =

Belgian one-day road cycling race

Race details
- Date: Mid-September
- Region: Belgium
- English name: Brussels Cycling Classic
- Discipline: Road
- Competition: UCI ProSeries
- Type: Single-day
- Web site: brusselscyclingclassic.be

History
- First edition: 1893
- Editions: 106 (as of 2026)
- First winner: André Henri (BEL)
- Most wins: Robbie McEwen (AUS) (5 wins)
- Most recent: Jordi Meeus (BEL)

The Brussels Cycling Classic (known until June 2013 as Paris–Brussels) is a semi classic European bicycle race, one of the oldest races on the international calendar.

== History ==
Paris–Brussels was first run on 12 August 1893 as an amateur event over a distance of 397 km, Belgian Andre Henry took the inaugural victory from compatriot Charles Delbecque with France's Fernand Augenault coming in third. The race did not return to the racing calendar until 1906 when it was run as a two-day event on 3 and 4 June. The first stage of this 1906 event was run from the Paris suburb of Villiers-sur-Marne to Reims over 152 km and was won by France's Maurice Bardonneau. Albert Dupont took the more challenging second stage on the following day from Reims to Brussels over 239 km to take the overall race victory from compatriots Jules Patou and Guillaume Coeckelberg. The following year the race reverted to being a one-day race and quickly established itself as one of the Spring Classics with a date towards the end of April, between Paris–Roubaix and Gent–Wevelgem. The event lost its prestige during the 1960s when the race was beset by traffic problems between the two capitals and the Dutch-promoted Amstel Gold Race took its place on the classics calendar. The race was not run between 1967 and 1972.

When the race returned in 1973 it was staged on a midweek date towards the end of September, just before Paris-Tours. The 1973 race was won by Eddy Merckx. In 1996 the race was switched from its midweek date back to being run on a Saturday. The most individual wins stood for a long time at three, by Octave Lapize (France) and Félix Sellier (Belgium). Lapize won in 1911, 1912 and 1913 and Sellier in 1922, 1923 and 1924. Lapize could have been a four-time winner but was disqualified after crossing the line first in the 1910 race when he and two other riders did not observe a mid race neutralised section, Maurice Brocco who crossed the line in fourth place was declared the eventual winner. In 2007, Robbie McEwen broke the record by winning his fourth race, and bettered this again with a fifth win in 2008.

In 2005 the race was set to change its name to the Grand Prix Eddy Merckx when an agreement was reached by the race organisers to amalgamate the two events. However, the deal fell through at the last minute and Paris–Brussels retained its name and the Grand Prix Eddy Merckx, a two rider time trial event, disappeared from the racing calendar.

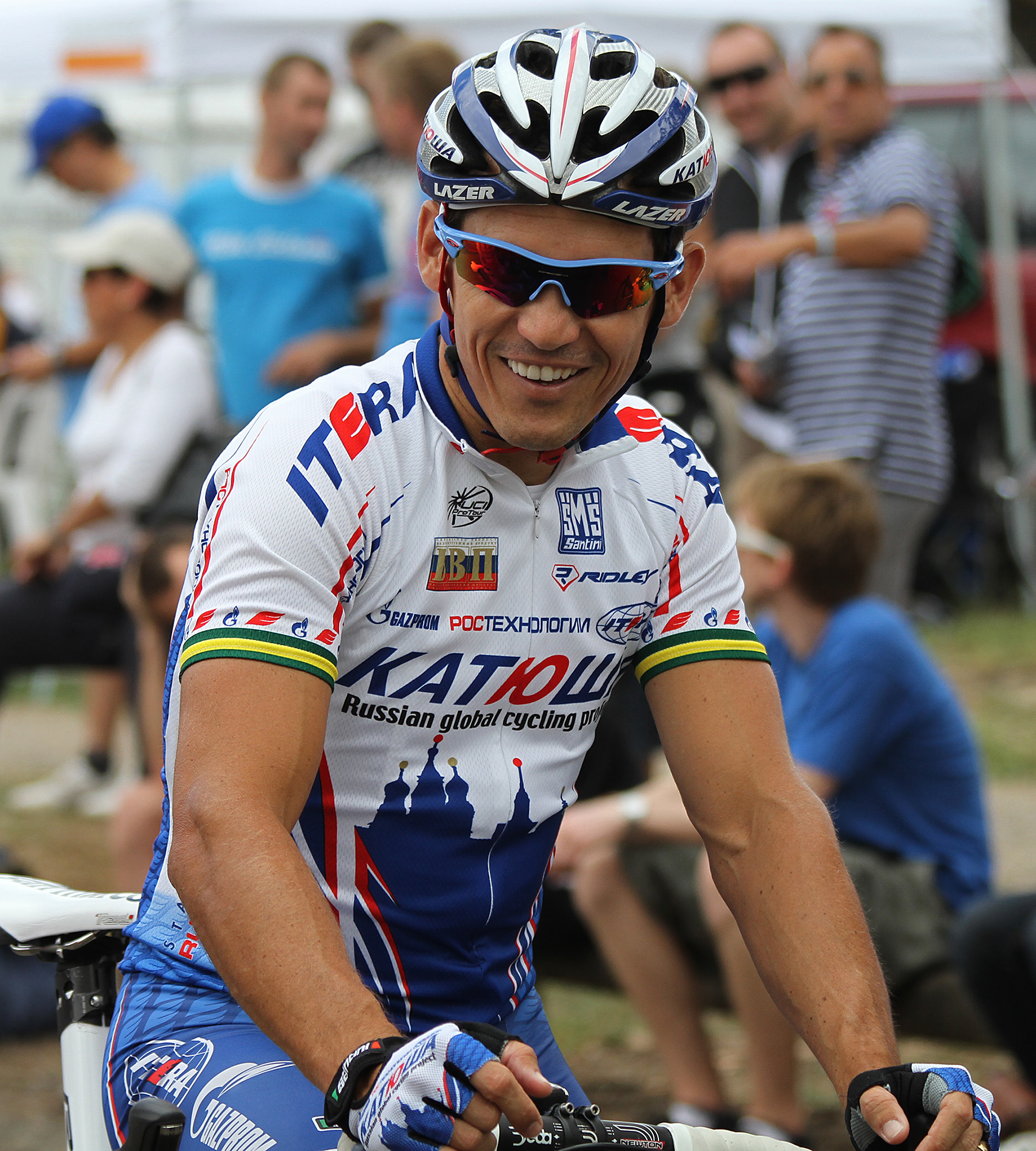
Robbie McEwen holds the record for most victories in Paris-Brussels with five wins.

In 2013 the race became the Brussels Cycling Classic and took place entirely in Belgium.

== Memorable races and victories ==
Octave Lapize's second victory in 1912 had an element of good fortune about it, Lucien Petit-Breton and Cyrille van Hauwaert had broken away and the race looked certain to be decided between them when both riders were knocked off their bikes by a police horse allowing Lapize to overtake and claim victory. The 1921 race won by Frenchman Robert Reboul was made controversial by the fact that a group of riders chasing a 15-man breakaway (including Reboul) was sent down the wrong route by the race director. One of the riders sent the wrong way in that 1921 race was Felix Sellier who made up for that disappointment by triumphing in the next three editions of the race. His three victories were not without difficulties however, in 1922 he survived a fierce attack from a cloud of insects, in 1923 he had to catch a break that had gained a fifteen-minute advantage and in 1924 he suffered two punctures in the latter part of the race just as the vital break was forming.

The victory by Belgian Ernest Mottard in 1930 featured one of the great escapes in the history of the race, Mottard broke away from the peloton with 130 miles (210 km) remaining and stayed away until the finish. Ireland's Shay Elliott was particularly unfortunate in 1958, he had a lead of over a minute with only three miles remaining when he smashed the frame of this bike with no team car near at hand, he was offered a touring bicycle by a spectator but was quickly caught by the chasing bunch and finished well down the field with Belgium's Rik Van Looy taking final victory. The 1963 edition of the race was made memorable by a small breakaway forming well before the border into Belgium, which was a rare event in itself. The break established a 13-minute lead and included Britain's Tom Simpson who was expected to win, being the best sprinter in the break, however his gears slipped in the final sprint and he lost out to France's Jean Stablinski.

The 1966 edition of Paris–Brussels was to be the last for seven years, as the race was beset by traffic problems to the route and a loss of prestige as the Amstel Gold Race took its place on the Spring Classics calendar. However, the 1966 race was made memorable by Italian Felice Gimondi who had won the 1965 Tour de France and seven days earlier had triumphed at Paris–Roubaix. Gimondi was the favourite for the race and a marked man, he lived up to his billing by breaking away with the help of teammate Dino Zandegu and winning the race in what was then a record time. Marc Demeyer claimed a close victory from Roger De Vlaeminck and Roger Rosiers in 1974 in the town of Alsemberg which hosted the finish of the race between 1973 and 1980. Gimondi's record time lasted until 1975 when Freddy Maertens won the race in what was then a record average speed for a professional race and being awarded the Ruban Jaune for averaging 46.11 km per hour throughout the 285.5 km course. Felice Gimondi won again in 1976, ten years after his first victory, once more breaking away while the sprinters watched each other.

The 1983 race saw Sweden's Tommy Prim become the first Scandinavian rider to win a classic race. The 1994 race saw a breakaway by Sean Yates, Rolf Sørensen and Franco Ballerini, animosity existed between Yates and Sørensen after a shirt pulling incident in the Tour de France of that year, however, Sørensen dropped his breakaway companions and triumphed. The 1983 victory by Prim saw the start of the trend of the Paris–Brussels winner coming from more diverse nationalities from non traditional cycling nations with victories going to riders from Germany, Holland, Denmark, Latvia, Australia and Luxembourg in the ensuing years. 2010 saw the first victory in the race by a Spaniard when Francisco Ventoso took victory as the race finished in the Uccle municipality of Brussels for the first time.

== Race length ==
Before 1926, the race was always over 400 km, with the longest versions being 440 km in 1913 and 1914. When the race returned after a break for the First World War in 1919 the race length was 417 km but this has reduced over the years with the 2010 edition being over a distance of 218 km, although as recently as 1987 the distance was 309 km when Wim Arras triumphed. The fastest edition of the race was 1975 when a tailwind helped Freddy Maertens finish with an average speed of 46.11 km/h.

== Route ==
The race started at Soissons, in Picardy, 85 km north-east of Paris, although prior to 1996 the race started in Noyon and during the 1980s in Senlis. The race is level for much of its route and quite often there is a headwind against the riders. The last 25 km of the race are characterised by a series of cobbled climbs such as the Alsemberg, Mont Saint Roch and the Keperenberg and it is on these climbs that the winning break is often made. The race ended for many years in the Anderlecht district of Brussels outside the Constant Vanden Stock Stadium in the Place de Linde. However the 2005 edition saw a new finishing line at the Atomium north of the centre of Brussels.

The quality of field has suffered since the Vuelta a España moved to September in 1995, many sprinter-roadmen preferring the Spanish Tour.

== Change to Brussels Classic ==
In June 2013 it was announced that the race would be renamed the Brussels classic and would take place entirely within Belgium. Starting at Cinquantenaire, the race now takes in 92 km within Walloon Brabant, 86 km in Flemish Brabant, and 23 km in the Brussels-Capital Region, for a total distance of 201 km. The race included eleven climbs including the double ascent of Vossemberg (twice), Smeysberg (twice) and the Langestraat (three times).

== Results ==
Year	Country	Rider	Team
↓ "Paris–Brussels" ↓
1893	Belgium	André Henry	
1894– 1905	No race		
1906	France	Albert Dupont	
1907	France	Gustave Garrigou	Peugeot–Wolber
1908	France	Lucien Petit-Breton	Peugeot–Wolber
1909	Luxembourg	François Faber	Alcyon–Dunlop
1910	France	Maurice Brocco	Legnano
1911	France	Octave Lapize	La Française–Diamant
1912	France	Octave Lapize	La Française–Diamant
1913	France	Octave Lapize	La Française–Diamant
1914	Belgium	Louis Mottiat	Alcyon-Soly
1915– 1918	No race		
1919	Belgium	Alexis Michiels	La Sportive
1920	France	Henri Pélissier	La Sportive
1921	France	Robert Reboul	individual
1922	Belgium	Félix Sellier	Alcyon–Dunlop
1923	Belgium	Félix Sellier	Alcyon–Dunlop
1924	Belgium	Félix Sellier	Alcyon–Dunlop
1925	Belgium	Gerard Debaets	individual
1926	Belgium	Denis Verschueren	Ravat–Wonder–Dunlop
1927	Luxembourg	Nicolas Frantz	Alcyon–Dunlop
1928	Belgium	Georges Ronsse	Automoto
1929	Belgium	Pé Verhaegen	J.B. Louvet–Hutchinson
1930	Belgium	Ernest Mottard	Cycles Bovy
1931	Belgium	Jean Aerts	Alcyon–Dunlop
1932	Belgium	Julien Vervaecke	Labor
1933	France	Albert Barthélémy	F. Pélissier–Mercier–Hutchinson
1934	Belgium	Frans Bonduel	Dilecta–Wolber
1935	Belgium	Edgard De Caluwé	Dilecta–Wolber
1936	Belgium	Éloi Meulenberg	Alcyon–Dunlop
1937	Belgium	Albert Beckaert	Alcyon–Dunlop
1938	Belgium	Marcel Kint	Mercier–Hutchinson
1939	Belgium	Frans Bonduel	Dilecta–Wolber
1940– 1945	No race		
1946	Belgium	Briek Schotte	Alcyon–Dunlop
1947	Belgium	Ernest Sterckx	Alcyon–Dunlop
1948	Belgium	Lode Poels	Garin–Wolber
1949	France	Maurice Diot	Mercier–A. Magne
1950	Belgium	Rik Van Steenbergen	Mercier–Hutchinson
1951	France	Jean Guéguen	Mercier–Hutchinson
1952	Belgium	Briek Schotte	Alcyon–Dunlop
1953	Italy	Loretto Petrucci	Bianchi–Pirelli
1954	Belgium	Marcel Hendrickx	Peugeot–Dunlop
1955	Belgium	Marcel Hendrickx	Elvé–Peugeot
1956	Belgium	Rik Van Looy	Faema–Van Hauwaert
1957	Belgium	Leon Vandaele	Faema–Guerra
1958	Belgium	Rik Van Looy	Faema–Guerra
1959	Belgium	Frans Schoubben	Peugeot–BP–Dunlop
1960	France	Pierre Everaert	Rapha–Gitane–Dunlop
1961	Belgium	Pino Cerami	Peugeot–BP–Dunlop
1962	Belgium	Jozef Wouters	Solo–Van Steenbergen
1963	France	Jean Stablinski	Saint-Raphaël–Gitane
1964	Belgium	Georges Van Coningsloo	Peugeot-BP-Englebert
1965	Belgium	Edward Sels	Solo–Superia
1966	Italy	Felice Gimondi	Salvarani
1967– 1972	No race		
1973	Belgium	Eddy Merckx	Molteni
1974	Belgium	Marc Demeyer	Carpenter–Flandria
1975	Belgium	Freddy Maertens	Carpenter–Flandria
1976	Italy	Felice Gimondi	Bianchi–Campagnolo
1977	Belgium	Ludo Peeters	IJsboerke–Colnago
1978	Netherlands	Jan Raas	TI–Raleigh–McGregor
1979	Belgium	Ludo Peeters	IJsboerke–Warncke Eis
1980	Italy	Pierino Gavazzi	Magniflex–Olmo
1981	Belgium	Roger De Vlaeminck	Daf Trucks–Côte d'Or
1982	Netherlands	Jacques Hanegraaf	TI–Raleigh–Campagnolo
1983	Sweden	Tommy Prim	Bianchi–Piaggio
1984	Belgium	Eric Vanderaerden	Panasonic
1985	Netherlands	Adri van der Poel	Kwantum–Decosol–Yoko
1986	Italy	Guido Bontempi	Carrera Jeans–Vagabond
1987	Belgium	Wim Arras	PDM–Ultima–Concorde
1988	West Germany	Rolf Gölz	Superconfex–Yoko–Opel–Colnago
1989	Netherlands	Jelle Nijdam	Superconfex–Yoko–Opel–Colnago
1990	Italy	Franco Ballerini	Del Tongo–Rex
1991	Denmark	Brian Holm	Histor–Sigma
1992	Denmark	Rolf Sørensen	Ariostea
1993	France	Francis Moreau	GAN
1994	Denmark	Rolf Sørensen	GB–MG Maglificio
1995	Belgium	Frank Vandenbroucke	Mapei–GB–Latexco
1996	Italy	Andrea Tafi	Mapei–GB
1997	Italy	Alessandro Bertolini	MG Maglificio–Technogym
1998	Italy	Stefano Zanini	Mapei–Bricobi
1999	Latvia	Romāns Vainšteins	Vini Caldirola
2000	Netherlands	Max van Heeswijk	Mapei–Quick-Step
2001	France	Emmanuel Magnien	Française des Jeux
2002	Australia	Robbie McEwen	Lotto–Adecco
2003	Luxembourg	Kim Kirchen	Fassa Bortolo
2004	Belgium	Nick Nuyens	Quick-Step–Davitamon
2005	Australia	Robbie McEwen	Davitamon–Lotto
2006	Australia	Robbie McEwen	Davitamon–Lotto
2007	Australia	Robbie McEwen	Predictor–Lotto
2008	Australia	Robbie McEwen	Silence–Lotto
2009	Australia	Matthew Goss	Team Saxo Bank
2010	Spain	Francisco Ventoso	Carmiooro NGC
2011	Russia	Denis Galimzyanov	Team Katusha
2012	Belgium	Tom Boonen	Omega Pharma–Quick-Step
↓ "Brussels Cycling Classic" ↓
2013	Germany	André Greipel	Lotto–Belisol
2014	Germany	André Greipel	Lotto–Belisol
2015	Netherlands	Dylan Groenewegen	Team Roompot
2016	Belgium	Tom Boonen	Etixx–Quick-Step
2017	France	Arnaud Démare	FDJ
2018	Germany	Pascal Ackermann	Bora–Hansgrohe
2019	Australia	Caleb Ewan	Lotto–Soudal
2020	Belgium	Tim Merlier	Alpecin–Fenix
2021	Belgium	Remco Evenepoel	Deceuninck–Quick-Step
2022	Netherlands	Taco van der Hoorn	Intermarché–Wanty–Gobert Matériaux
2023	France	Arnaud Démare	Groupama–FDJ
2024	Norway	Jonas Abrahamsen	Uno-X Mobility
2025	Belgium	Tim Merlier	Soudal–Quick-Step
2026	Belgium	Jordi Meeus	Red Bull–Bora–Hansgrohe

=== Wins per country ===
Wins	Country
50	Belgium
18	France
9	Italy
7	Australia; Netherlands
4	Germany (including West Germany)
3	Denmark; Luxembourg
1	Latvia; Norway; Russia; Spain; Sweden
