= 1906 Giro di Lombardia =

Race details
- Dates: 11 November 1906
- Stages: 1
- Distance: 197 km (122.4 mi)
- Winning time: 7h 28' 39"

Results
	Winner	Cesare Brambilla (ITA)
	Second	Carlo Galetti (ITA)
	Third	Luigi Ganna (ITA)

The 1906 Giro di Lombardia was the second edition of the Giro di Lombardia cycle race and was held on 11 November 1906. The race started and finished in Milan. The race was won by Cesare Brambilla.

== General classification ==
Final general classification

Rank	Rider	Time
1	Cesare Brambilla (ITA)	5h 33' 46"
2	Carlo Galetti (ITA)	+ 7"
3	Luigi Ganna (ITA)	+ 4' 41"
4	Mario Gaioni (ITA)	+ 4' 58"
5	Ernesto Ferrari (ITA)	+ 32' 42"
6	Clemente Canepari (ITA)	+ 32' 42"
7	Eberardo Pavesi (ITA)	+ 38' 49"
8	Carlo Mairani (ITA)	+ 55' 08"
9	Carlo Bordoni (ITA)	+ 55' 09"
10	Mario Lonati (ITA)	+ 55' 09"
