= Robert Reboul =

French cyclist

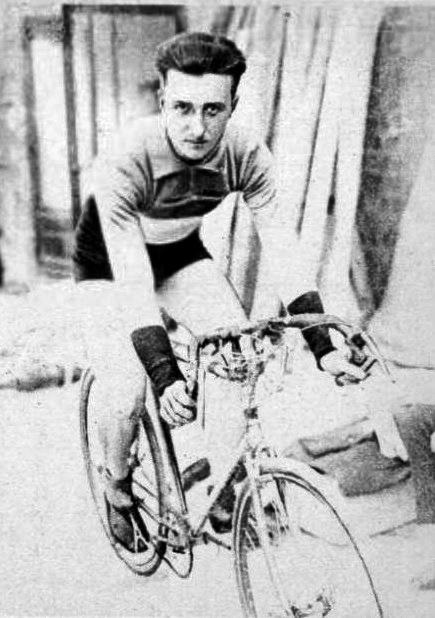

Personal information
- Born: 24 July 1893 Paris, France
- Died: 22 January 1969 (aged 75) Bordeaux, France

Cycling career
- Sport: Cycling
- Discipline: Road
- Role: Rider

Robert Reboul (24 July 1893 – 22 January 1969) was a French racing cyclist. He rode in the 1923 Tour de France. He also won the 1921 Paris–Brussels.
