= 1908 Giro di Lombardia =

Race details
- Dates: 8 November 1908
- Stages: 1
- Distance: 210 km (130.5 mi)
- Winning time: 7h 18' 36"

Results
	Winner	François Faber (LUX)	(Peugeot–Wolber)
	Second	Luigi Ganna (ITA)	(Atala)
	Third	Giovanni Gerbi (ITA)	(Peugeot–Wolber)

The 1908 Giro di Lombardia was the fourth edition of the Giro di Lombardia cycle race and was held on 8 November 1908. The race started in Milan and finished in Sesto San Giovanni. The race was won by François Faber of the Peugeot team.

== General classification ==
Final general classification

Rank	Rider	Team	Time
1	François Faber (LUX)	Peugeot–Wolber	7h 18' 36"
2	Luigi Ganna (ITA)	Atala	+ 14' 57"
3	Giovanni Gerbi (ITA)	Peugeot–Wolber	+ 24' 09"
4	Carlo Mairani (ITA)	Individual	+ 56' 09"
5	Guido Ghirardini (ITA)	Individual	+ 1h 20' 09"
6	Annibali Magni (ITA)	Individual	+ 1h 25' 24"
7	Francesco Amelli (ITA)	Individual	+ 2h 03' 49"
8	Adolfo Denti (ITA)	Individual	+ 2h 20' 24"
9	Pietro Tanni (ITA)	Individual	+ 2h 25' 24"
10	Sante Goi (ITA)	Individual	+ 2h 50' 56"
