= Georges Devilly =

French cyclist

Personal information
- Full name: Georges Devilly
- Died: 2 January 1920

Cycling career
- Sport: Cycling
- Role: Rider

Georges Devilly was a French racing cyclist. He finished in last place in the 1909 Tour de France. In November 1919 he participated in and finished the Grand Prix de l'Armistice. A month later he contracted the Spanish flu of which he died on 2 January 1920.
