= Jules Deloffre =

French cyclist

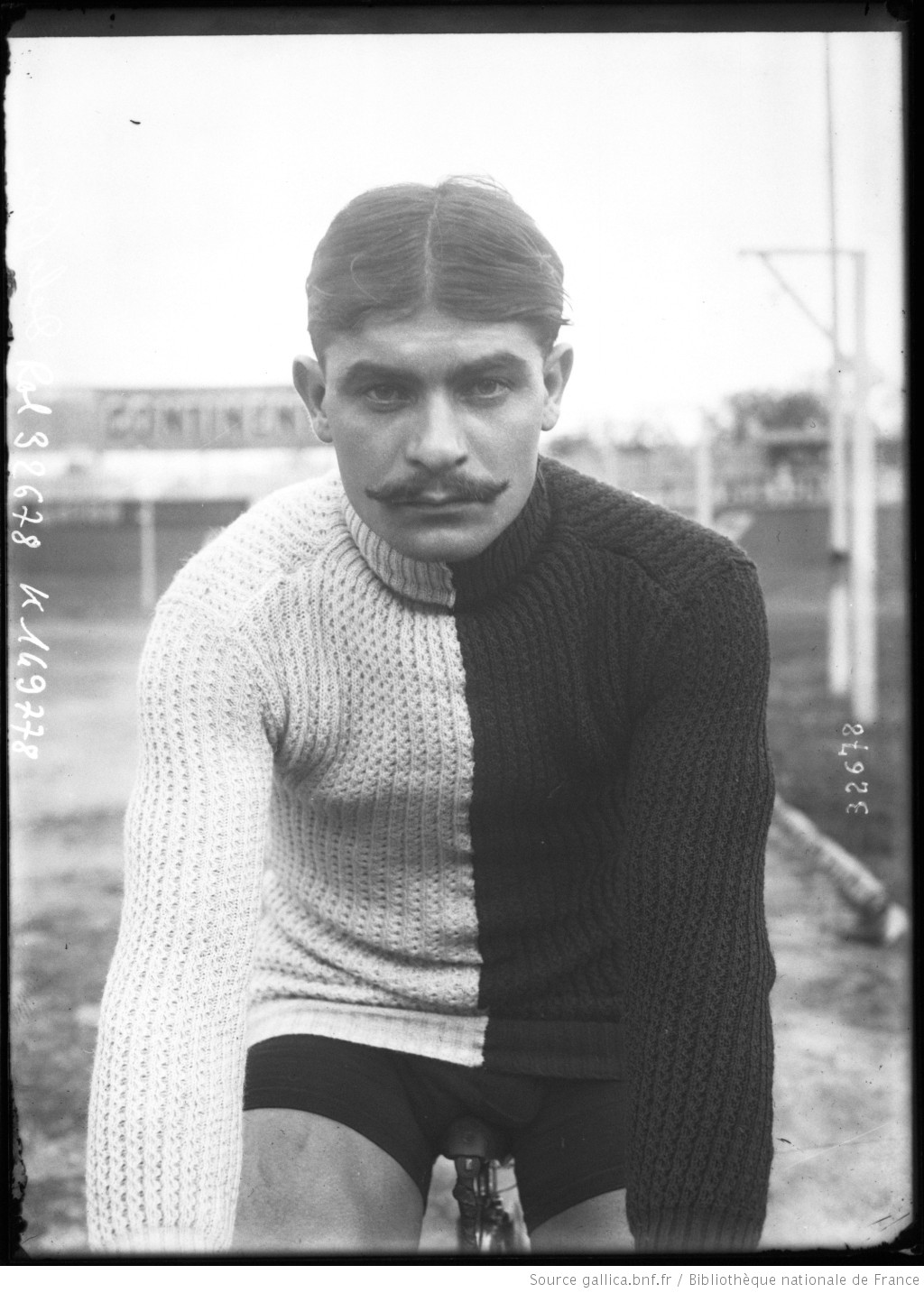

Personal information
- Born: 22 April 1885 Caudry, France
- Died: 13 October 1963 (aged 78) Caudry, France

Cycling career
- Sport: Cycling
- Role: Rider

Jules Deloffre (22 April 1885 – 13 October 1963) was a French racing cyclist. He rode in fourteen editions of the Tour de France between 1908 and 1928, finishing in seven of them. Throughout his career he was nicknamed 'The Acrobat' (French: L' Acrobate). During the First World War, he served in the infantry under Colonel Driant in Verdun and a street was named after him in Le Cateau-Cambrésis where he is considered a local hero.

== Early years ==
His parents were Jules Romain DELOFFRE (born 1858) and Marie Julia LEMPEREUR (born 1866).

== Career ==
Between 1920 and 1985, he was the record holder for the number of participations in the Tour de France, and even sole holder of this record until 1966 and the fourteenth participation of André Darrigade. Deloffre was famous for performing acrobatics in front of the public at the finishings of stages, winning some subsidies. This was what motivated him to run his last five Tours de France, when he was 38 to 43 years old and he no longer had the physical means to complete in the event. In his book "This is the Tour de France", Michel Duino wrote:

"On each arrival, Deloffre performed somersaults for the amazed onlookers. 'Unheard of!' the spectators exclaimed. To have 300km in the legs and to succeed in that, true, it is better than in the circus! Deloffre used to thank "his" audience, by singing "Le P'tit Quinquin" when he did not feel like being the acrobat, wearing a top hat. To many French people, the Tour, it was him!

== General classification results timeline ==
Tour de France general classification results
Grand Tour	1908	1909	1910	1911	1912	1913	1914	1915	1916	1917	1918	1919	1920	1921	1922	1923	1924	1925	1926	1927	1928
Tour de France	DNF	16	16	15	21	12	36	—	—	—	—	—	DNF	26	—	DNF	—	DNF	DNF	DNF	DNF

Legend
—	Did not compete
DNF	Did not finish

He also competed in the most prestigious classic races of his time:

- Paris-Roubaix: 22nd in 1908, 27th in 1911, 28th in 1912.
- Bordeaux-Paris: 10th in 1911, 12th in 1913, 14th in 1914, 13th in 1923, 6th in 1924, 11th in 1925, and 13th in 1926.
- Paris-Bruxelles: 9th in 1909, 16th in 1921, 17th in 1923 and 19th in 1927.
- Paris-Brest-Paris: 19th in 1911.
- the Bol d'Or: 2nd in 1925.
- the Trophée des Grimpeurs.
- the Critérium des As.

== Professional Teams ==
- 1909: Nil-Supra.
- 1910: Le Globe - Dunlop.
- 1911: Panneton - Dunlop.
- 1923: Colombia - Samyn.

== Personal life ==
Deloffre married twice in Caudry, firstly on 12 August 1911 to Joséphine Maria Delcourte and secondly on 24 January 1924 to Anaïs Sophie Deschanvres. After his sporting retirement, he continued to attend regional races, and it was while riding his bicycle from the 'Criterium International de Cambrai' on 13 October 1963, that he was run over by a car leaving Caudry. He did not survive his injuries. The "Father Jules" (French: Le Père Jules) was 78 years old.
