= Maurice Brocco =

French cyclist (1883–1965)

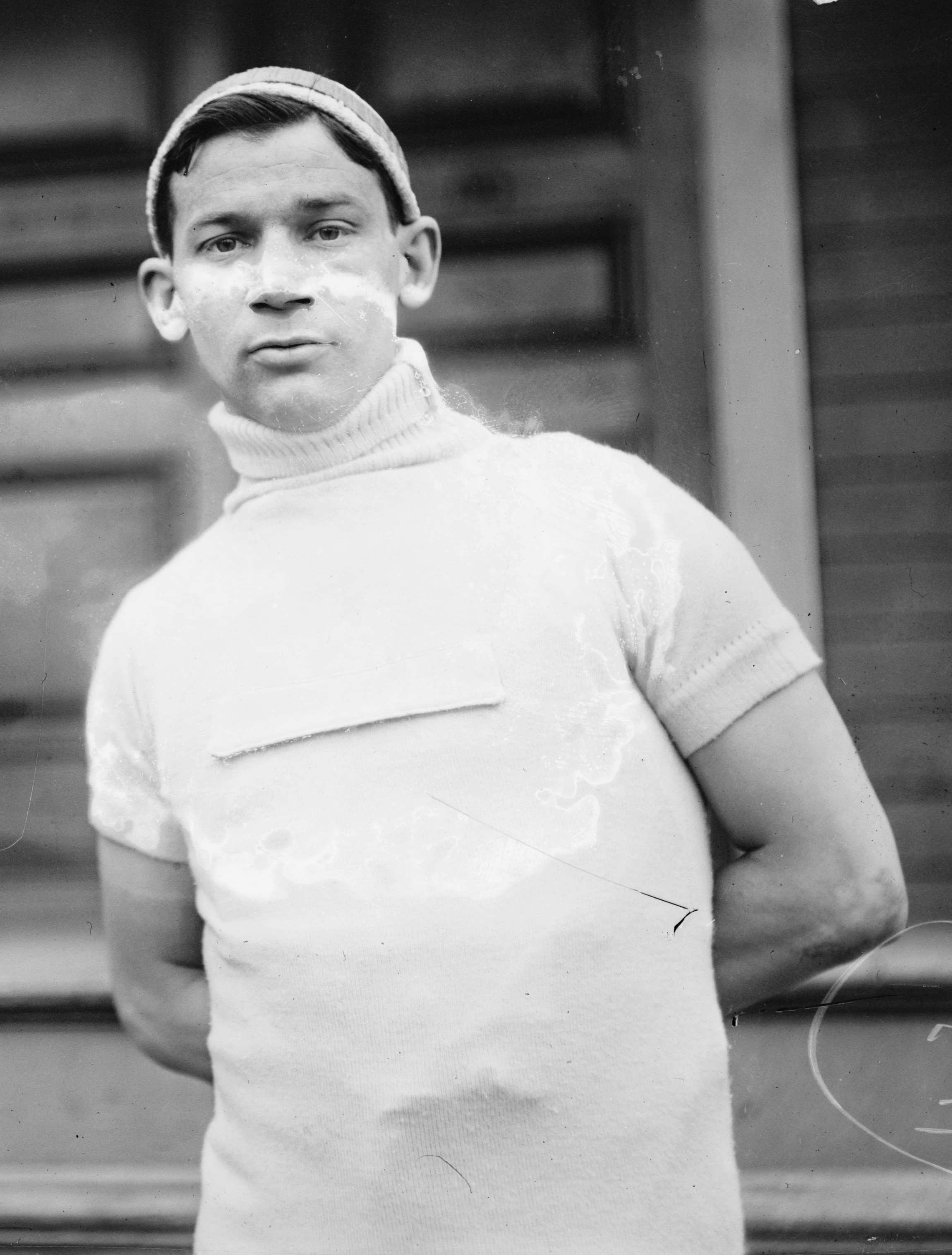
- Brocco in 1912

Personal information
- Full name: Maurice Brocco
- Nickname: Coco
- Born: 28 January 1883 Fismes, France
- Died: 26 June 1965 (aged 82) Mûrs-Erigné, France

Cycling career
- Sport: Cycling
- Discipline: Road
- Role: Rider

Major wins
- Paris–Brussels (1910); One stage Tour de France

Maurice Brocco (28 January 1883 – 26 June 1965) was a French professional road bicycle racer between 1906 and 1927. He was born into a family of Swiss-Italian immigrants. In 1911 he won a stage in the Tour de France. He participated six times in the Tour de France, but finished the race only once. In his later career he was successful in six-day races.

In the 1911 Tour de France, Brocco was disqualified because he helped François Faber, which was not allowed. Brocco appealed, he was allowed to start the next stage. Brocco won that stage, and his disqualification was completed after the stage.

== Racing career ==
Brocco first became prominent as a rider in 1907 when he won the Paris-Dieppe race as an amateur. He turned professional the following year (1908) and rode the Tour de France for the first time, abandoning the race on the ninth stage. 1910 saw Brocco take his best win of his road racing career when he triumphed in Paris–Brussels. Brocco initially finished the race in fourth place but the first three riders, including Octave Lapize who had crossed the line first, were disqualified for not observing a mid race neutralised section, leaving Brocco to be declared the winner. Throughout his career Brocco had a good record in the French National road cycling championships, he never won the race but finished 2nd on two occasions (1910 & 1913) and third on four occasions (1908, 1914, 1919 & 1920). The Giro di Lombardia was another race in which Brocco excelled, finishing 5th in 1911, 3rd in 1912 and 2nd in 1913. Brocco lost some of his best years as a rider to World War I but he did return to racing in 1919 as a 34-year-old and found some success in Six-day racing winning the Six Days Of New York on three occasions, in 1920 with Willy Coburn, in 1921 with Alfred Goullet and in 1924 with Marcel Buysse. He also won the Six Days Of Chicago in 1923 partnered by Oscar Egg.

== Origin of 'domestique' ==
A domestique in cycling is a rider employed to sacrifice his own chances for those of his leader. That is an accepted role today but was against the rules in the first decades of the Tour de France, when riders had to ride for themselves and not help or be helped by others. The word was first used in cycling as an insult for Brocco, in 1911.

Brocco's chances ended when he lost time on the day to Chamonix. Unable to win, he next day offered his services to other riders, for which he had a reputation François Faber was in danger of being eliminated for taking too long and the two came to a deal. Brocco waited for Faber and paced him to the finish. Henri Desgrange, the organiser and chief judge, wanted to disqualify him for breaking the rules. But he had no proof and feared Brocco would appeal to the national cycling body, the Union Vélocipédique Française. He limited himself to scorn in his newspaper, L'Auto, writing: "He is unworthy. He is no more than a domestique."

Next morning Brocco greeted Desgrange with: "Today, monsieur, we are going to settle our accounts." He won the day by 34 minutes. Desgrange followed him and the yellow jersey, Gustave Garrigou as they climbed the Tourmalet. "So, am I forbidden to ride with him?", Brocco shouted. On the following mountain, the Aubisque, he dropped Garrigou, passed Paul Duboc, who had been poisoned and was in agony beside the road, and took the lead with Émile Georget. Desgrange was still watching.

"Alors, quoi," Brocco shouted, "do I have the right to stay with him?" And then he rode off alone and won. He had made two points to Desgrange. The first was that he was a talented rider and not a servant. The second was that he had so much talent that his poor riding with Faber could only have been through a commercial arrangement. Desgrange said that any rider with such flair had clearly been selling the race.

"He deserves his punishment," Desgrange wrote. "Immediate disqualification."

- Domestiques had long been accepted in other races. Desgrange believed the Tour should be a race of individuals and fought repeatedly with the sponsors, bicycle factories, who saw it otherwise. Desgrange got rid of the factories' influence only by reorganising the Tour for national teams in 1930, with the effect that he thereby acknowledged teamwork and therefore domestiques.

== Major results ==
1908
Hervé - Tienen - Hervé
Rennes - Brest
1910
Paris–Brussels
1911
Tour de France:

Winner stage 10

1914
Paris-Nancy
1920
Six days of New York
1921
Six days of New York
1923
Six days of Chicago
1924
Six days of New York
