= Lucien Roquebert =

French cyclist

Personal information
- Full name: Lucien Roquebert
- Born: 12 January 1890 Ychoux, France
- Died: 8 February 1970 (aged 80) Dax, France

Cycling career
- Sport: Cycling
- Role: Rider

Lucien Roquebert (12 January 1890 – 8 February 1970) was a French racing cyclist. He finished in last place in the 1911 Tour de France.
