= Alcyon (cycling team) =

French professional cycling team, 1905-1962

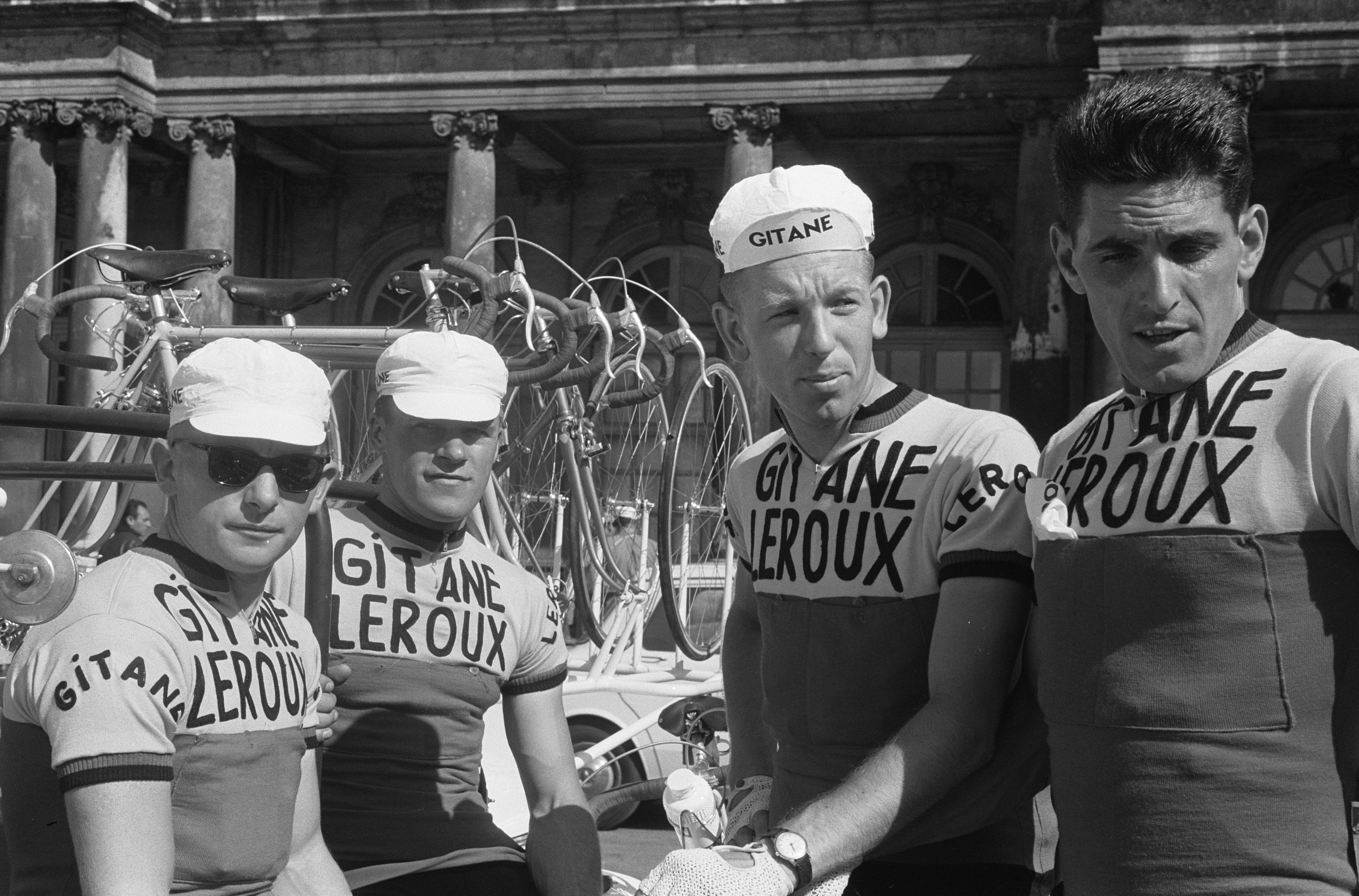
- Gitane–Leroux–Dunlop–R. Geminiani riders Gérard Thiélin, Anatole Novak, Bas Maliepaard and Jean Forestier at the 1962 Tour de France

Team information
- Registered: France
- Founded: 1905
- Disbanded: 1962
- Discipline: Road

Team name history
- 1905–1912 1913–1914 1915–1921 1922–1931 1932 1933–1959 1961 1962: Alcyon–Dunlop; Alcyon–Soly; Alcyon; Alcyon–Dunlop; Alcyon–Armor; Alcyon–Dunlop; Alcyon–Leroux; Gitane–Leroux–Dunlop–R. Geminiani
Alcyon jersey
Jersey

Alcyon was a French professional cycling team that was active from 1905 to 1959, and returned in 1961 and 1962. It was started by Alcyon, a French bicycle, automobile and motorcycle manufacturer.

== History ==
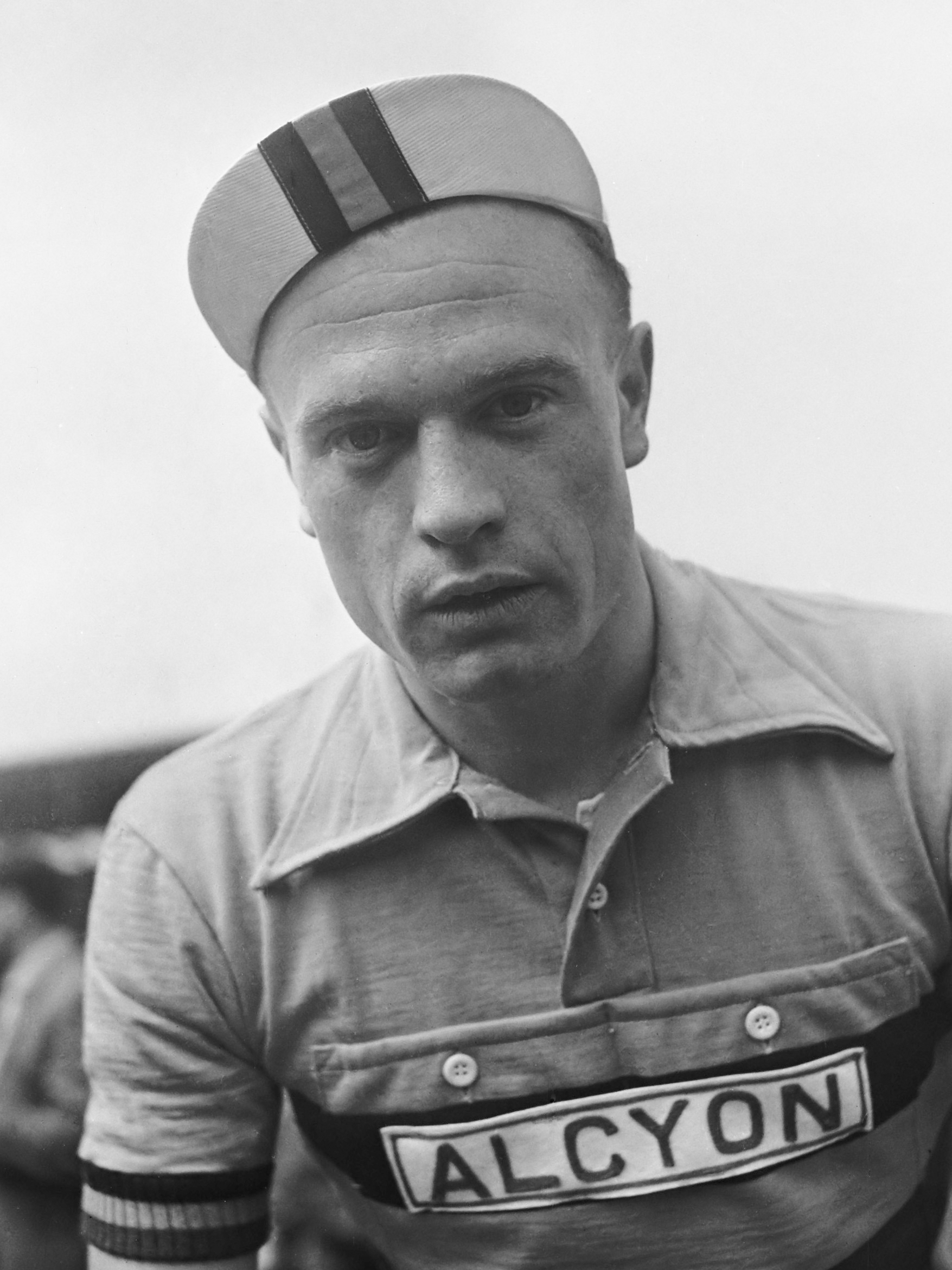
Germain Derycke at the 1954 Tour de France

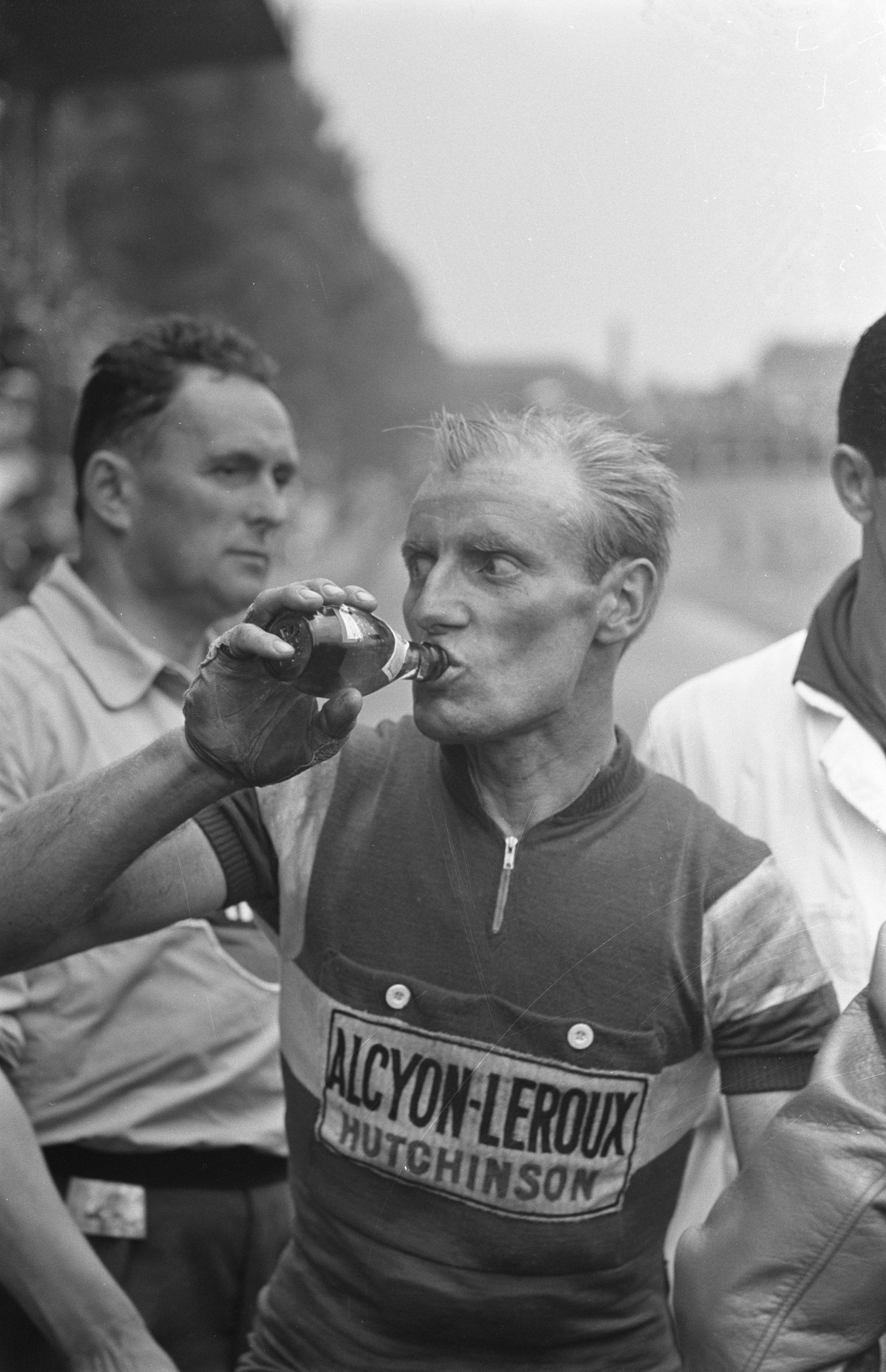
André Darrigade at the 1961 Tour de France

The team won the Tour de France four times before World War I with François Faber in 1909, Octave Lapize in 1910, Gustave Garrigou in 1911 and Odile Defraye in 1912. Alcyon won the team prize at the Tour de France from 1909 to 1912 and then from 1927 to 1929. In 1909, Calais is de manager of the team and Alphonse Baugé sports directeur. Ludovic Feuillet takes over this position in 1910.

Immediately after the First World War, Alcyon like many other bicycle companies joined a Consortium that employed many riders under the La Sportive name. This consortium would win the Tour de France from 1919 to 1921. The Consortium stopped in 1922 and the member companies which included Automoto, Peugeot and Alcyon restarted up their separate cycling teams. Alcyon grew into a very strong team that dominated the Tour de France with three wins in with Nicolas Frantz in 1927 and in 1928 and Maurice De Waele in 1929.

Alcyon dominated the Tour de France during the 1920s. In the 1929 edition, Maurice Dewaele won the race despite the fact that he was sick when the race went through the Alps. This was because no one attacked the Alcyon rider there. The organisers of the Tour de France decided in 1930 that the race would be disputed by national teams. It has been said that this was done to break the domination of some of the commercial teams, most notably Alcyon As a result, Alcyon was unable to continue to dominate the race. However Alycon-Dunlop riders riding for the French national team were able to dominate the race, such as André Leducq, an Alycon-Dunlop rider who won the very first Tour that was disputed by national teams. Leducq would win the Tour again in 1932, while another Alycon rider, Georges Speicher won the Tour again in 1933. Belgians Romain Maes and Sylvère Maes were riders of the team when they won the Tour de France in 1935, 1936 and 1939.

After World War II, the team name changed to Alcyon-BP (1946–1949), which was followed by Alcyon-Dunlop (1950–1954). Alcyon stopped sponsoring the team after 1958, although a team existed for 1961 and 1962, managed by former rider Georges Speicher.

== Major wins ==
- Bordeaux–Paris 1906, 1907, 1909, 1911, 1913, 1914, 1923, 1926, 1939, 1946
- Belgian National Cyclo Cross Championship 1953
- French National Cyclo-Cross Championship 1909, 1910, 1911, 1912,
- Luxembourgish National Cyclo Cross Championship 1924, 1940
- Critérium du Dauphiné 1962
- Flèche Wallonne 1947
- Giro di Lombardia 1913
- Gent–Wevelgem 1946, 1947, 1950, 1955
- Grand Prix des Nations 1941, 1942
- Kuurne–Brussels–Kuurne 1949, 1955
- Liège–Bastogne–Liège 1921, 1922, 1923, 1924, 1936, 1937, 1945, 1953
- Milan–San Remo 1908, 1910, 1911, 1912, 1913, 1955
- Omloop Het Volk 1945, 1946
- Paris–Brussels 1909, 1914, 1922, 1923, 1924, 1927, 1931, 1936, 1937, 1946, 1947
- Paris–Nice 1934
- Paris–Roubaix 1908, 1910, 1925, 1930, 1931, 1933, 1935, 1937, 1939, 1944, 1945, 1953
- Paris–Tours 1909, 1910, 1912, 1924, 1929, 1934, 1935, 1936, 1938, 1941, 1942, 1945, 1946, 1947
- Belgian National Road Race Championships 1908, 1909, 1919, 1922, 1926, 1934, 1935, 1936, 1937, 1942, 1946, 1947
- French National Road Race Championships 1909, 1936, 1937, 1938, 1942, 1943, 1944
- Luxembourgish National Road Race Championships 1924, 1925, 1927, 1928, 1929, 1930, 1931, 1932, 1933, 1937, 1938
- German National Road Race Championships 1937
- Tour of Flanders 1914, 1934, 1939, 1948
- Scheldeprijs Vlaanderen 1924, 1934, 1952, 1955
- Tour de Corrèze 1932, 1933, 1935
- Tour of the Basque Country 1928,1929
- Tour of Belgium 1909, 1910, 1911, 1912, 1913, 1914, 1919, 1920, 1922, 1923, 1924, 1926, 1933
- Tour de France General classification 1909, 1910, 1911, 1912, 1927, 1928, 1929
- Tour du Var 1962
- Vuelta a España General classification 1947
- Volta a Catalunya 1940
- World Road Race Championship 1933, 1935, 1937, 1948
