= Jules Masselis =

Belgian cyclist

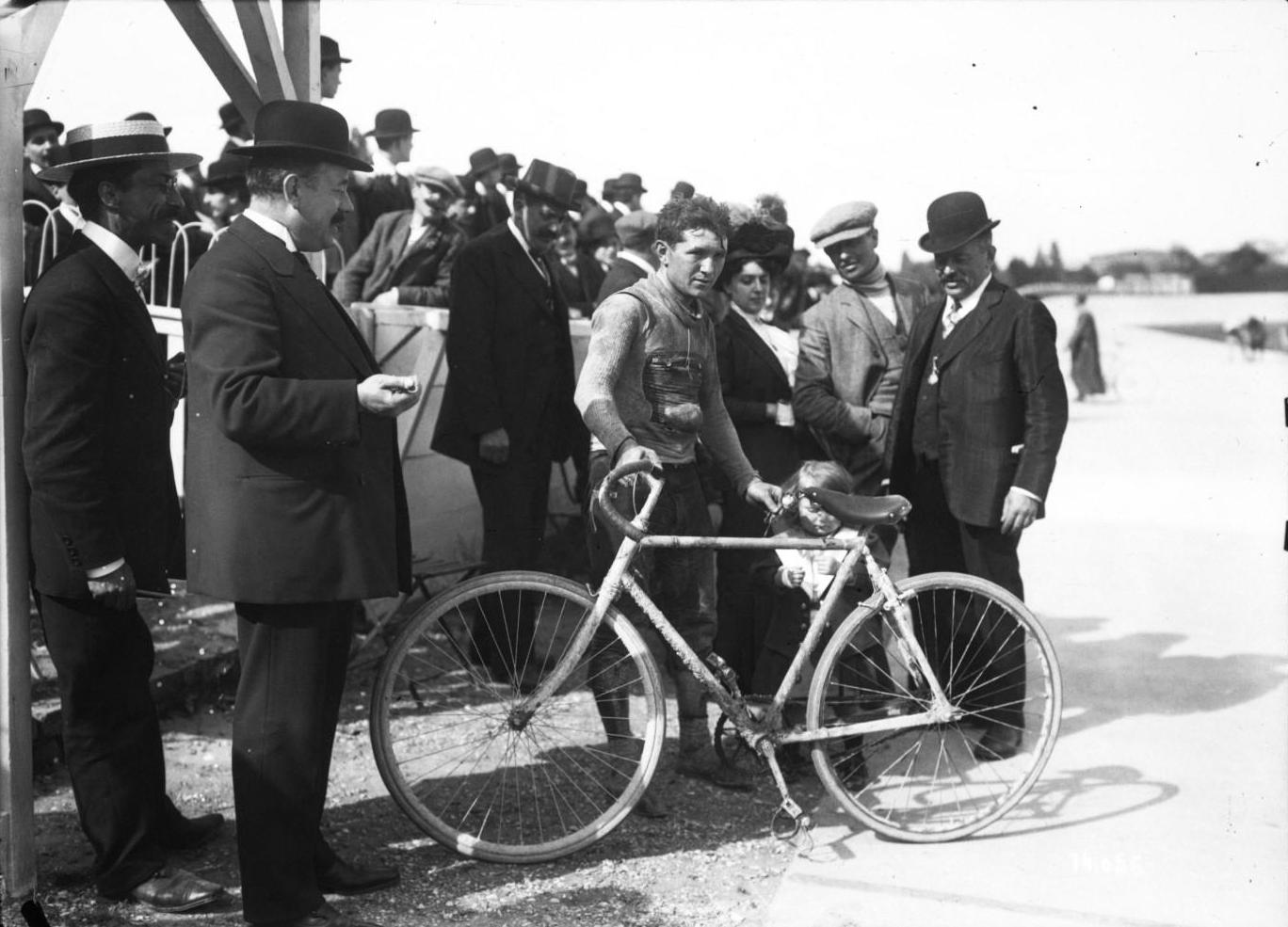

Personal information
- Full name: Jules Masselis
- Born: 19 November 1886 Ledegem, Belgium
- Died: 29 July 1965 (aged 78) Roeselare, Belgium

Cycling career
- Sport: Cycling
- Discipline: Road
- Role: Rider

Jules Masselis (Ledegem, 19 November 1886 – Roeselare, 29 July 1965) was a Belgian professional road bicycle racer, who won two stages in the Tour de France and was leading the general classification for two nonconsecutive days.

== Major results ==
1908
Deinze
Omloop van het Houtland
1909
Paris-Sedan
Paris-Liège
1910
Tour of Belgium, including 2 stages
1911
Tour de France

Winner stage 2
Leading classification for one day

1912
Paris-Menin
1913
Tour de France

Winner stage 2
Leading classification for one day

1926
Moorslede
