= Marcel Godivier =

French cyclist

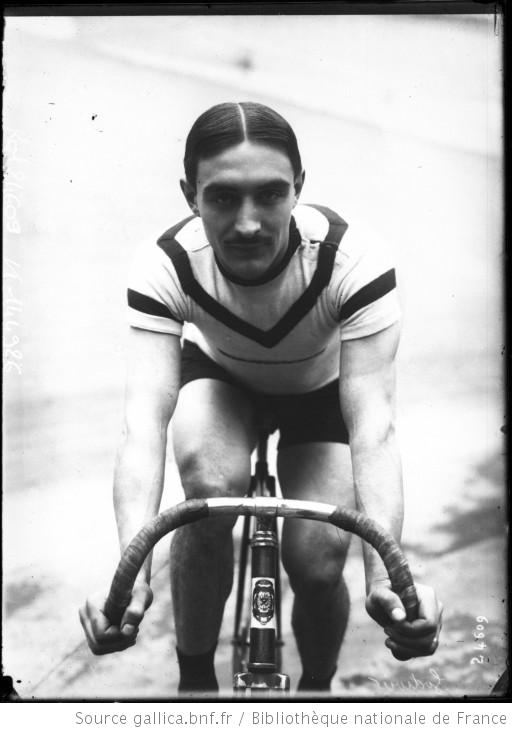
- Marcel Godivier

Personal information
- Full name: Marcel Godivier
- Born: 17 January 1887 Versailles, France
- Died: 9 February 1963 (aged 76) Dreux, France

Cycling career
- Sport: Cycling
- Discipline: Road
- Role: Rider

Major wins
- One stage Tour de France

Marcel Godivier (born 17 January 1887 in Versailles – died 9 February 1963 in Dreux) was a French professional road bicycle racer who won two stages in the 1911 Tour de France and finished in the top 10 of the overall classification twice.

== Major results ==
1908
Tour de France:

9th place general classification

1909
París-Chateauroux
1911
Tour de France:

Winner stage 12
Winner stage 15
6th place general classification

París-Beaugency
1917
Le Mont St Michel-París
