= Ottavio Pratesi =

Italian cyclist

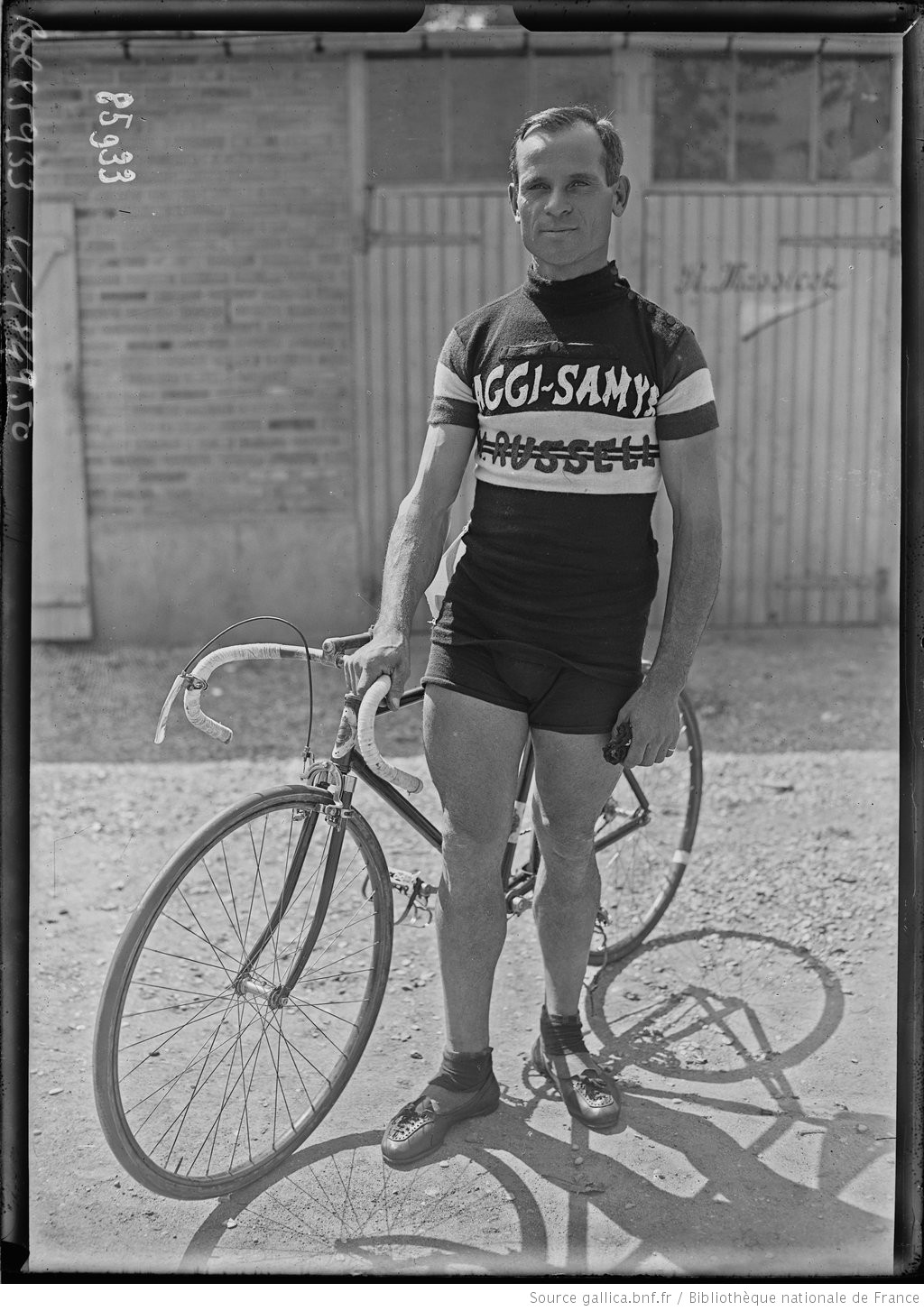

Personal information
- Born: 1 January 1889
- Died: 3 November 1977 (aged 88)

Cycling career
- Sport: Cycling
- Discipline: Road
- Role: Rider

Major wins
- Stage races Giro dei Tre Mari (1919, 1920)

Ottavio Pratesi (1 January 1889 – 3 November 1977) was an Italian racing cyclist. He rode in the 1923 Tour de France.
