= Albert Dupont =

Belgian cyclist (born 1884)

Personal information
- Born: 25 January 1884 Estaimpuis, Belgium
- Died: 20th-century
- Height: 170 cm (5 ft 7 in)
- Weight: 68 kg (150 lb)

Cycling career
- Sport: Cycling
- Discipline: Road
- Role: Rider

Professional teams
- 1908: Alcyon
- 1909: Cnops / Individual
- 1910: Individual
- 1911–1912: Le Globe
- 1913: La Française
- 1914: Individual

Major wins
- Paris–Brussels (1906)

Albert Dupont (25 January 1884 — 20th century) was a Belgian professional road cyclist, active from 1908 to 1914. He is best known for winning the amateur edition of the Paris–Brussels in 1906.

== Career ==
Dupont was born in Estaimpuis, Belgium. He began competing as an amateur and won the Paris–Brussels race in 1906, claiming both a stage victory and the overall title. He turned professional in 1908 with the Alcyon team. Over seven seasons, he raced for several teams including Cnops, Le Globe, and La Française.

He competed in five editions of the Tour de France, finishing ninth overall in the 1911 edition and was on the podium finishing third in stage 13.

== Major results ==
1906
1st Overall Paris–Brussels

1st Stage 2

1909
6th Overall Tour of Belgium
1910
9th Paris-Menin
10th Overall Tour of Belgium
1911
6th Overall Paris–Brussels
8th Overall Etoile Caroloregienne
9th Overall Tour de France
1912
7th Overall Tour of Belgium
8th Bordeaux–Paris

=== Grand Tour general classification results ===
Race	1908	1909	1911	1912	1913
Tour de France	DNF	DNF	9th	DNF	DNF

=== Classic races results ===
Race	1906	1907	1908	1909	1910	1911	1912	1913
Paris–Roubaix	—	—	—	—	11th	21st	37th	47th
Paris–Brussels	1st	20th	—	—	24th	6th	—	—
Tour of Belgium	NH	NH	?	6th	10th	?	7th	—
Paris–Brest–Paris	NH	NH	NH	NH	NH	11th	NH	NH
Bordeaux–Paris	—	—	—	—	—	—	8th	—
Paris–Tours	—	—	—	—	—	—	18th	—
