= Gustave Garrigou =

French cyclist

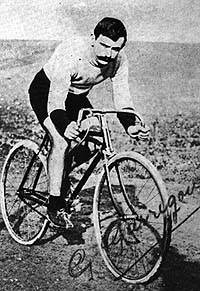

Personal information
- Full name: Cyprien Gustave Garrigou
- Born: 24 September 1884 Vabre-Tizac, France
- Died: 28 January 1963 (aged 78) Esbly, France

Cycling career
- Sport: Cycling
- Discipline: Road
- Role: Rider
- Rider type: All-rounder

Professional teams
- 1907–1908: Peugeot
- 1909–1912: Alcyon
- 1913–1914: Peugeot

Major wins
- Grand Tours Tour de France General classification (1911) Mountains classification (1908) 8 individual stages (1907, 1909-1911, 1913, 1914) One-day races and Classics National Road Race Championships (1907, 1908) Milan–San Remo (1911) Giro di Lombardia (1907) Paris–Brussels (1907) Circuito Bresciano (1910) Paris–Amiens (1904, 1905) Paris–Dieppe (1905)

Cyprien Gustave Garrigou (pronounced [ɡystav ɡaʁiɡu]; 24 September 1884 – 23 January 1963) was one of the best professional racing cyclists of his era. He rode the Tour de France eight times and won once. Of 117 stages, he won eight, came in the top ten 96 times and finished 65 times in the first five.

== Career ==
Garrigou was born in Vabres, France, and lived in Paris. He gained from his lightness in the mountains but had the strength to ride hard on flat stages, and had remarkable powers of recovery. As an amateur he won Paris-Amiens and Paris-Dieppe. He turned professional in 1907 and that year won the national championship, the Giro di Lombardia, Paris–Brussels and came second in the Tour de France 19 points behind teammate Lucien Petit-Breton. A team rider, in the next three years, he placed fourth in 1908, second in 1909 and third in 1910 behind winning teammates Petit-Breton, Francois Faber and Octave Lapize.

He won the Tour in 1911 surviving not only the race but death threats because fans of another French rider, Paul Duboc, believed Garrigou to be behind an incident in which Duboc collapsed in the Pyrenees and lay in agony for an hour after drinking from a poisoned bottle.

Garrigou had built a lead of 16 points after the end of Stage 6 but by the time they reached the Pyrenees, Duboc had reduced it to 10 points. With Duboc finishing 3 hours behind, Garrigou finished second to consolidate a lead which increased when stage winner Maurice Brocco was disqualified for unsportsmanlike behaviour.

Feelings came to their height in Rouen, where Duboc lived and in which notices had been posted in his name pointing out that he would have been leading the Tour had he not been poisoned and inciting the crowd to take revenge. Duboc had nothing to do with the notices and was as alarmed as the race organizer, Henri Desgrange. Three cars provided a barrier between Garrigou and the crowd until the race had cleared the city. The culprit was eventually found to be a helper with a rival team but Duboc's supporters had suspected Garrigou, as the man most likely to profit from stopping Duboc.

Garrigou won the Tour with a generous number of points over Duboc. In some early years, the Tour was decided not on elapsed time but on points based on the position in which riders finished stages.

As leader of an all-French team, Alcyon, Garrigou was supposed to retain the title in 1912, but a last-minute publicity stunt cost him. The Belgian Odile Defraye was included in the team and repaid them by outsprinting Garrigou in stages 2 and 3 on the way to victory. Garrigou finished third behind Eugene Christophe.

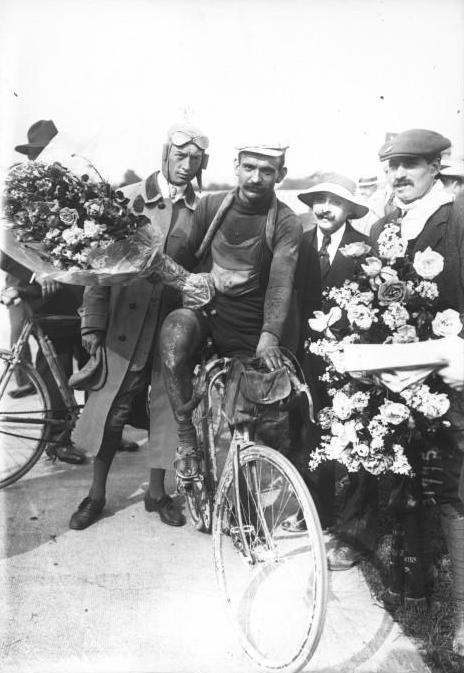
Garrigou at the 1913 Tour de France.

The Tour of 1913 saw the ending of the points system deciding the winner of the general classification. Garrigou finished in second place 8 minutes and 37 seconds behind another Belgian, Philippe Thys.

Garrigou was an all-rounder, also winning Paris–Brussels (1907), Milan–San Remo (1911) and the Giro di Lombardia. He was national champion in 1907 and 1908. His career ended with the outbreak of war in 1914.

== Retirement ==
Garrigou retired to Esbly, Paris, and went into business.

== Career achievements ==
=== Major results ===
1907
Tour de France - 2nd Overall, Stage 10 and 12 wins
Giro di Lombardia - 1st Overall
Paris–Brussels - 1st Place
1908
Tour de France - 4th Overall
1909
Tour de France - 2nd Overall, 1 Stage win
1910
Tour de France - 3rd Overall, 1 stage win
1911
Tour de France - 1st Overall, 2 stage wins
Milan–San Remo, 1st Place
1912
Tour de France - 3rd Overall
Paris–Roubaix - 2nd Place
1913
Tour de France - 2nd Overall, 1 stage win
1914
Tour de France - Stage 11 win

=== Grand Tour results timeline ===
	1907	1908	1909	1910	1911	1912	1913	1914
Giro d'Italia	N/A	N/A	DNE	DNE	DNE	DNE	DNE	DNE
Stages won	N/A	N/A	—	—	—	—	—	—
Tour de France	2	4	2	3	1	3	2	5
Stages won	2	0	1	1	2	0	1	1
Vuelta a España	N/A	N/A	N/A	N/A	N/A	N/A	N/A	N/A
Stages won	N/A	N/A	N/A	N/A	N/A	N/A	N/A	N/A

Legend
1	Winner
2–3	Top three-finish
4–10	Top ten-finish
11–	Other finish
DNE	Did not enter
DNF-x	Did not finish (retired on stage x)
DNS-x	Did not start (not started on stage x)
HD-x	Finished outside time limit (occurred on stage x)
DSQ	Disqualified
N/A	Race/classification not held
NR	Not ranked in this classification
