= Henri Devroye =

Belgian cyclist

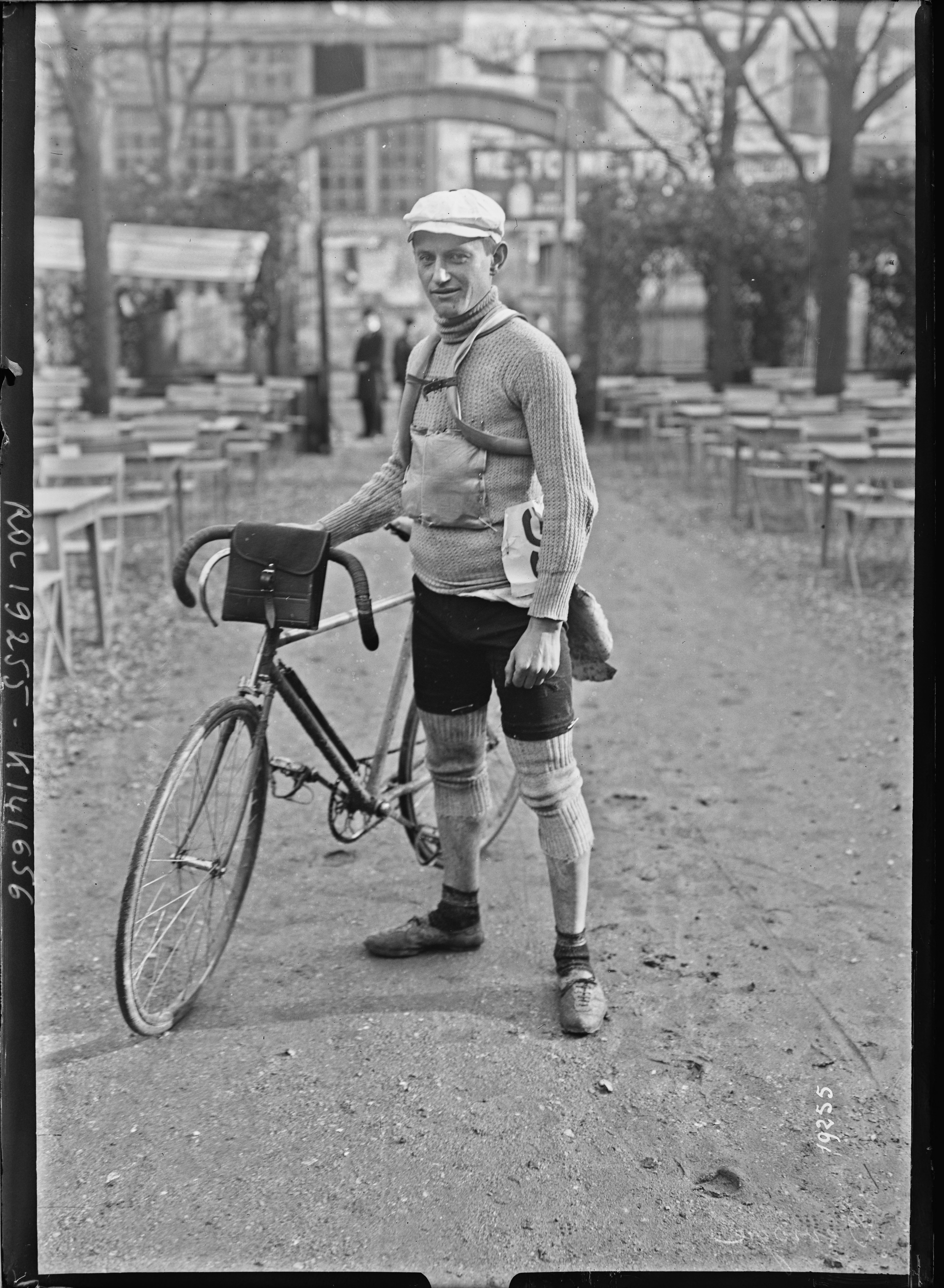

Personal information
- Born: 21 October 1884
- Died: 4 April 1955 (aged 70)

Cycling career
- Sport: Cycling
- Role: Rider

Henri Devroye (21 October 1884 – 4 April 1955) was a Belgian racing cyclist. He rode in the 1920 Tour de France.
