= Paul Duboc =

French cyclist

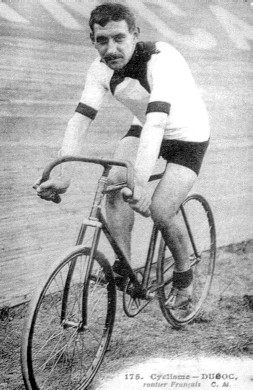
- Paul Duboc

Personal information
- Full name: Paul Duboc
- Nickname: La pomme (The Apple)
- Born: 2 April 1884 Rouen, France
- Died: 19 August 1941 (aged 57) Paris, France

Cycling career
- Sport: Cycling
- Discipline: Road
- Role: Rider

Major wins
- Grand Tours Tour de France 5 individual stages (1909, 1911)

Paul Duboc (2 April 1884 – 19 August 1941) was a French professional road bicycle racer from 1907 through 1927. Despite winning 5 career stages in the Tour de France, he may be most remembered for being disqualified at the 1919 Tour de France for borrowing a car to go and repair his pedal axle. In 1911, Duboc was close to winning the Tour de France, when he became ill after drinking from a poisoned bottle given to him. His fans were blaming the classification leader Gustave Garrigou, and the Tour organizers advised Garrigou to ride under disguise. Duboc would end the 1911 Tour de France in second place, his best result.

== Major results ==
1907
Paris-Rungis
1908
11th, Overall, Tour de France
1909 – Alcyon
1st, Overall, Tour of Belgium
4th, Overall, Tour de France

1st, Stage 13, (Brest - Caen, 415 km)
2nd, Stage 10, (Bayonne - Bordeaux, 269 km)
3rd, Stage 6, (Grenoble - Nice, 345 km)

1911
2nd, Overall, Tour de France

1st, Stage 8, (Marseille - Perpignan, 335 km)
1st, Stage 9, (Perpignan - Bagnères-de-Luchon, 289 km)
1st, Stage 11, (Bayonne - La Rochelle, 379 km)
1st, Stage 14, (Cherbourg - Le Havre, 361 km)

1914
31st, Overall, Tour de France
1919
8th, Overall, Tour de France (but later disqualified)
1923
18th, Overall, Tour de France
1926
27th, Overall, Tour de France
