= La Française (cycling team) =

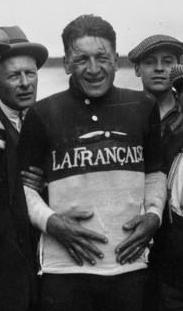
- Joseph Mauclair in 1929

Team information
- Registered: France
- Founded: 1901
- Disbanded: 1955
- Discipline: Road

Team name history
- 1901–1906 1907 1908–1910 1911–1913 1914 1920–1923 1924 1925 1926 1927 1928 1929–1930 1934–1935 1936 1937 1938–1943 1944 1945 1946–1947 1949 1950 1951 1952 1953 1954 1955: La Française; La Française–Persan; La Française; La Française–Diamant; La Française–Hutchinson; La Française; La Française–Diamant–Dunlop; La Française; La Française–Diamant–Dunlop; La Française; La Française–Dunlop; La Française–Diamant–Dunlop; La Française–Dunlop; La Française–Diamant–Dunlop; La Française–Dunlop; La Française; La Française–Dunlop; La Française; La Française–Dunlop; La Française–Dunlop; La Française–Diamant–Dunlop; La Française–Dunlop; La Française; La Française–Dunlop; La Française; La Française–Dunlop

La Française (English: The French) was a French professional cycling team that existed from 1901 to 1955. Maurice Garin won the 1903 Tour de France with the team. Their rider Léon Scieur won the 1921 Tour de France when riders participated as individuals.
