= List of teams and cyclists in the 1913 Tour de France =

The 1913 Tour de France started with 140 cyclists; there were 51 cyclists distributed over 9 teams, including all favourites for the overall victory. The remaining 89 cyclists started in the isolés category. This edition started with six former Tour de France winners (Louis Trousselier, Lucien Petit-Breton, François Faber, Octave Lapize, Gustave Garrigou and Odile Defraye), the most ever.

Although cyclists had started in teams previously, the rules had forbidden them to work together against other cyclists. In 1913, this changed, and cyclists from the same team were allowed to work together. The organizers preferred riders to ride solo, so they added a rule that if a cyclist would win a stage with a margin of 20 minutes or more, he would not only get his own prize money, but also the half of all the other cyclists' prize money of that stage.

The first African cyclist took part in the Tour de France in 1913: Ali Neffati from Tunisia. Neffati had been discovered by Tour organizer Henri Desgrange, and would later become a driver at l'Auto, the newspaper that organised the Tour de France.

== Cyclists ==
=== By starting number ===
Legend
No.	Starting number worn by the rider during the Tour
Pos.	Position in the general classification
DNF	Denotes a rider who did not finish

No.	Name	Nationality	Team	Pos.	Ref
1	Émile Georget	France	La Française-Diamant	DNF	
2	Charles Crupelandt	France	La Française-Diamant	DNF	
3	Octave Lapize	France	La Française-Diamant	DNF	
4	Paul Duboc	France	La Française-Diamant	DNF	
5	Maurice Brocco	France	La Française-Diamant	DNF	
6	Charles Cruchon	France	La Française-Diamant	DNF	
7	Arthur Maertens	Belgium	La Française-Diamant	DNF	
8	Pierre Vandevelde	Belgium	La Française-Diamant	DNF	
9	François Faber	Luxembourg	Peugeot-Wolber	5	
10	Jean Alavoine	France	Peugeot-Wolber	19	
11	Eugène Christophe	France	Peugeot-Wolber	7	
12	Marcel Buysse	Belgium	Peugeot-Wolber	3	
13	Paul Hostein	France	Peugeot-Wolber	17	
14	Gustave Garrigou	France	Peugeot-Wolber	2	
15	Philippe Thys	Belgium	Peugeot-Wolber	1	
16	Émile Engel	France	Peugeot-Wolber	10	
17	Lucien Mazan	France	Automoto-Continental	DNF	
18	Georges Passerieu	France	Automoto-Continental	DNF	
19	Paul Deman	Belgium	Automoto-Continental	14	
20	Maurice Leturgie	France	Automoto-Continental	DNF	
21	Victor Doms	Belgium	Automoto-Continental	DNF	
22	Constant Niedergang	France	Automoto-Continental	DNF	
23	Charles Charron	France	Automoto-Continental	DNF	
24	Constant Ménager	France	Automoto-Continental	DNF	
25	Odile Defraye	Belgium	Alcyon-Soly	DNF	
26	René Vandenberghe	Belgium	Alcyon-Soly	DNF	
27	Henri Pélissier	France	Alcyon-Soly	DNF	
28	Louis Heusghem	Belgium	Alcyon-Soly	DNF	
29	Jean Rossius	Belgium	Alcyon-Soly	DNF	
30	Louis Mottiat	Belgium	Alcyon-Soly	DNF	
31	Jules Masselis	Belgium	Alcyon-Soly	DNF	
32	Émile Masson	Belgium	Alcyon-Soly	DNF	
33	Alfred Depauw	Belgium	Liberator-Hutchinson	DNF	
34	Henri Hanlet	Belgium	Liberator-Hutchinson	DNF	
35	Marcel Godivier	France	Liberator-Hutchinson	DNF	
36	Alfons Lauwers	Belgium	Liberator-Hutchinson	DNF	
37	Giovanni Micheletto	Italy	Griffon-Continental	DNF	
38	Firmin Lambot	Belgium	Griffon-Continental	4	
39	Angelo Gremo	Italy	Griffon-Continental	DNF	
40	Félicien Salmon	Belgium	Griffon-Continental	DNF	
41	Joseph Van Daele	Belgium	JB Louvet-Continental	9	
42	Alfons Spiessens	Belgium	JB Louvet-Continental	6	
44	Pierino Albini	Italy	JB Louvet-Continental	DNF	
45	Clemente Canepari	Italy	JB Louvet-Continental	13	
46	Eberardo Pavesi	Italy	JB Louvet-Continental	DNF	
47	Louis Trousselier	France	JB Louvet-Continental	11	
48	René Guénot	France	JB Louvet-Continental	DNF	
49	Léon Scieur	Belgium	Armor-Soly	DNF	
50	Pierre-Joseph Heusghem	Belgium	Armor-Soly	DNF	
51	Henri Devroye	Belgium	Labor-Soly	DNF	
52	Jacques Coomans	Belgium	Labor-Soly	DNF	
101	Marcel Billion	France	Lone rider	DNF	
102	René Blandet	France	Lone rider	DNF	
103	Alcide Riviere	France	Lone rider	DNF	
104	Luigi Gorret	France	Lone rider	DNF	
105	Léon Bonnery	France	Lone rider	DNF	
106	François Chevalier	France	Lone rider	DNF	
107	Henri Alavoine	France	Lone rider	25	
108	Alfred Niklaus	France	Lone rider	DNF	
109	Henri Timmermann	Belgium	Lone rider	DNF	
110	Albert Cartigny	France	Lone rider	DNF	
111	Albert Nouchet	France	Lone rider	DNF	
113	Maurice Leliaert	Belgium	Lone rider	18	
114	Ernest Berthet	France	Lone rider	DNF	
115	Georges Oudin	France	Lone rider	DNF	
116	Vincent D’Hulst	Belgium	Lone rider	15	
117	François Bertrand	France	Lone rider	DNF	
118	Fernand Pin	France	Lone rider	DNF	
119	Louis Gabba	France	Lone rider	DNF	
120	René Barret	France	Lone rider	DNF	
121	Albert Macon	France	Lone rider	DNF	
122	Christian Christensen	Denmark	Lone rider	DNF	
123	Marcel Rottie	France	Lone rider	DNF	
124	Émile Bouhours	France	Lone rider	DNF	
125	Augustin Ringeval	France	Lone rider	DNF	
126	Marcel Lallement	France	Lone rider	DNF	
127	Alain Andrin	France	Lone rider	DNF	
128	Louis Coolsaet	Belgium	Lone rider	21	
129	Achiel De Smet	Belgium	Lone rider	22	
130	André Batilly	France	Lone rider	DNF	
131	Lucien Leman	France	Lone rider	DNF	
133	Charles Dumont	Switzerland	Lone rider	23	
134	Ernest Tobler	Switzerland	Lone rider	DNF	
135	Michel Franc	France	Lone rider	DNF	
136	Louis Flamand	France	Lone rider	DNF	
137	Guido Decoster	France	Lone rider	DNF	
140	Maurice Borel	France	Lone rider	DNF	
142	Henri Menager	France	Lone rider	DNF	
143	Celidonio Morini	Switzerland	Lone rider	24	
145	Paul Lepine	France	Lone rider	DNF	
146	Louis Villemus	France	Lone rider	DNF	
147	Ali Neffati	Tunisia	Lone rider	DNF	
148	Louis Ferrault	France	Lone rider	DNF	
149	Émile Lachaise	France	Lone rider	DNF	
150	Auguste Spelle	Belgium	Lone rider	DNF	
151	Jules Deloffre	France	Lone rider	12	
152	Peter Böhm	Germany	Lone rider	DNF	
153	Joanny Panel	France	Lone rider	DNF	
154	Louis Verbraecken	Belgium	Lone rider	DNF	
155	Charles Privas	France	Lone rider	DNF	
157	Auguste Rossignol	France	Lone rider	DNF	
158	André Renard	France	Lone rider	DNF	
159	Camille Mathieu	France	Lone rider	DNF	
161	Eugène Monnarat	France	Lone rider	DNF	
162	Louis Moliere	France	Lone rider	DNF	
163	Auguste Pierron	France	Lone rider	DNF	
164	Henry Fontaine	France	Lone rider	DNF	
165	Yves Quideau	France	Lone rider	DNF	
166	Albert Chiarena	France	Lone rider	DNF	
167	Maurice Rossi	France	Lone rider	DNF	
168	Pierre Delplace	France	Lone rider	DNF	
169	Camillo Bertarelli	Italy	Lone rider	8	
170	Henri Murat	France	Lone rider	DNF	
171	Marcel Allain	France	Lone rider	DNF	
172	Gaston Neboux	France	Lone rider	DNF	
173	Philippe Alary	France	Lone rider	DNF	
174	Camille Botte	Belgium	Lone rider	DNF	
175	Giuseppe Contesini	Italy	Lone rider	20	
176	Joseph Chanteperdrix	France	Lone rider	DNF	
178	Adolphe Dorion	France	Lone rider	DNF	
180	Eugène Leroy	France	Lone rider	DNF	
183	Laurent Quemeneur	France	Lone rider	DNF	
184	Lucien Cornu	France	Lone rider	DNF	
185	Georges Devilly	France	Lone rider	DNF	
186	Henri Serverin	France	Lone rider	DNF	
187	Gustave Verbeken	Belgium	Lone rider	DNF	
190	Emile Druz	France	Lone rider	DNF	
191	Henri Leclerc	France	Lone rider	DNF	
193	Jean Bouillet	France	Lone rider	DNF	
194	Pierre Everaerts	Belgium	Lone rider	DNF	
195	Joseph Verdickt	Belgium	Lone rider	DNF	
196	José Samyn	France	Lone rider	DNF	
198	Maurice Lartigue	France	Lone rider	DNF	
199	Louis Petitjean	Belgium	Lone rider	16	
200	Jos Zorloni	Switzerland	Lone rider	DNF	
203	Antoine Wattelier	France	Lone rider	DNF	
205	Jules Sales	Belgium	Lone rider	DNF	
207	Eugène Platteau	Belgium	Lone rider	DNF	
208	Henri Van Lerberghe	Belgium	Lone rider	DNF	
209	Albert Dupont	Belgium	Lone rider	DNF	
