= 1913 Tour de France, Stage 1 to Stage 8 =

Cycling race stages

Route of the 1913 Tour de France

The 1913 Tour de France was the 11th edition of Tour de France, one of cycling's Grand Tours. The Tour began in Paris on 29 June and Stage 8 occurred on 13 July with a flat stage to Aix-en-Provence. The race finished in Paris on 27 July.

== Stage 1 ==
29 June 1913 — Paris to Le Havre, 388 km (241.1 mi)

Stage 1 result and general classification after stage 1

Rank	Rider	Team	Time
1	Giovanni Micheletto (ITA)	Griffon-Continental	14h 09' 47"
2	Marcel Buysse (BEL)	Peugeot-Wolber	s.t.
3	Jules Masselis (BEL)	Alcyon-Soly	s.t.
4	Alfons Lauwers (BEL)	Liberator-Hutchinson	s.t.
5	Félicien Salmon (BEL)	Griffon-Continental	s.t.
6	Constant Niedergang (FRA)	Automoto-Continental	s.t.
7	Odile Defraye (BEL)	Alcyon-Soly	s.t.
8	Émile Masson (BEL)	Alcyon-Soly	+ 50"
9	Philippe Thys (BEL)	Peugeot-Wolber	+ 1' 19"
10	René Vandenberghe (BEL)	Alcyon-Soly	+ 4' 50"

== Stage 2 ==
2 July 1913 — Le Havre to Cherbourg-en-Cotentin, 364 km (226.2 mi)

Stage 2 result

Rank	Rider	Team	Time
1	Jules Masselis (BEL)	Alcyon-Soly	12h 20' 06"
2	Lucien Mazan (FRA)	Automoto-Continental	s.t.
3	Odile Defraye (BEL)	Alcyon-Soly	s.t.
4	Marcel Buysse (BEL)	Peugeot-Wolber	s.t.
5	Henri Pélissier (FRA)	Alcyon-Soly	s.t.
6	Octave Lapize (FRA)	La Française-Diamant	s.t.
7	Gustave Garrigou (FRA)	Peugeot-Wolber	s.t.
8	Émile Georget (FRA)	La Française-Diamant	s.t.
9	Alfons Lauwers (BEL)	Liberator-Hutchinson	s.t.
10	Louis Mottiat (BEL)	Alcyon-Soly	s.t.

General classification after stage 2

Rank	Rider	Team	Time
=1	Jules Masselis (BEL)	Alcyon-Soly	26h 29' 53"
=1	Odile Defraye (BEL)	Alcyon-Soly	s.t.
=1	Marcel Buysse (BEL)	Peugeot-Wolber	s.t.
=1	Alfons Lauwers (BEL)	Liberator-Hutchinson	s.t.
5			
6			
7			
8			
9			
10			

== Stage 3 ==
4 July 1913 — Cherbourg-en-Cotentin to Brest, 405 km (252 mi)

Stage 3 result

Rank	Rider	Team	Time
1	Henri Pélissier (FRA)	Alcyon-Soly	13h 58' 45"
2	Odile Defraye (BEL)	Alcyon-Soly	s.t.
3	Louis Mottiat (BEL)	Alcyon-Soly	+ 2"
4	Lucien Mazan (FRA)	Automoto-Continental	s.t.
5	Jean Rossius (BEL)	Alcyon-Soly	+ 4"
6	Émile Georget (FRA)	La Française-Diamant	s.t.
7	Marcel Buysse (BEL)	Peugeot-Wolber	s.t.
8	Gustave Garrigou (FRA)	Peugeot-Wolber	s.t.
9	Eugène Christophe (FRA)	Peugeot-Wolber	+ 5"
10	Jacques Coomans (BEL)	Labor-Soly	+ 2' 05"

General classification after stage 3

Rank	Rider	Team	Time
1	Odile Defraye (BEL)	Alcyon-Soly	40h 28' 38"
2	Marcel Buysse (BEL)	Peugeot-Wolber	+ 4"
3	Jean Rossius (BEL)	Alcyon-Soly	+ 4' 54"
4			
5			
6			
7			
8			
9			
10			

== Stage 4 ==
6 July 1913 — Brest to La Rochelle, 470 km (290 mi)

Stage 4 result

Rank	Rider	Team	Time
1	Marcel Buysse (BEL)	Peugeot-Wolber	16h 10' 16"
2	Odile Defraye (BEL)	Alcyon-Soly	s.t.
3	Louis Mottiat (BEL)	Alcyon-Soly	s.t.
4	Philippe Thys (BEL)	Peugeot-Wolber	s.t.
5	Jacques Coomans (BEL)	Labor-Soly	s.t.
6	Eugène Christophe (FRA)	Peugeot-Wolber	s.t.
7	Gustave Garrigou (FRA)	Peugeot-Wolber	+ 51"
8	Émile Engel (FRA)	Peugeot-Wolber	s.t.
9	Firmin Lambot (BEL)	Griffon-Continental	s.t.
10	François Faber (LUX)	Peugeot-Wolber	+ 15' 23"

General classification after stage 4

Rank	Rider	Team	Time
1	Odile Defraye (BEL)	Alcyon-Soly	56h 38' 54"
2	Eugène Christophe (FRA)	Peugeot-Wolber	+ 5' 04"
3	Marcel Buysse (BEL)	Peugeot-Wolber	+ 10' 13"
4			
5			
6			
7			
8			
9			
10			

== Stage 5 ==
8 July 1913 — La Rochelle to Bayonne, 379 km (235 mi)

Stage 5 result

Rank	Rider	Team	Time
1	Henri Van Lerberghe (BEL)	Lone rider	12h 40' 28"
2	Pierre Everaerts (BEL)	Lone rider	s.t.
3	Camillo Bertarelli (ITA)	Lone rider	+ 5' 48"
4	Marcel Buysse (BEL)	Peugeot-Wolber	+ 15' 00"
5	Eugène Christophe (FRA)	Peugeot-Wolber	s.t.
6	Émile Engel (FRA)	Peugeot-Wolber	s.t.
7	Odile Defraye (BEL)	Alcyon-Soly	s.t.
8	René Vandenberghe (BEL)	Alcyon-Soly	s.t.
9	Lucien Mazan (FRA)	Automoto-Continental	s.t.
10	Gustave Garrigou (FRA)	Peugeot-Wolber	s.t.

General classification after stage 5

Rank	Rider	Team	Time
1	Odile Defraye (BEL)	Alcyon-Soly	
2	Eugène Christophe (FRA)	Peugeot-Wolber	+ 4' 55"
3	Marcel Buysse (BEL)	Peugeot-Wolber	+ 10' 05"
4			
5			
6			
7			
8			
9			
10			

== Stage 6 ==
10 July 1913 — Bayonne to Luchon, 326 km (203 mi)

Stage 6 result

Rank	Rider	Team	Time
1	Philippe Thys (BEL)	Peugeot-Wolber	13h 54' 23"
2	Marcel Buysse (BEL)	Peugeot-Wolber	+ 17' 57"
3	Gustave Garrigou (FRA)	Peugeot-Wolber	+ 29' 59"
4	Firmin Lambot (BEL)	Griffon-Continental	+ 34' 29"
5	Lucien Mazan (FRA)	Automoto-Continental	+ 36' 17"
6	Jean Rossius (BEL)	Alcyon-Soly	+ 48' 32"
7	Joseph Van Daele (BEL)	JB Louvet-Continental	+ 50' 16"
8	François Faber (LUX)	Peugeot-Wolber	+ 52' 33"
9	Paul Hostein (FRA)	Peugeot-Wolber	s.t.
10	Louis Mottiat (BEL)	Alcyon-Soly	+ 1h 01' 30"

General classification after stage 6

Rank	Rider	Team	Time
1	Philippe Thys (BEL)	Peugeot-Wolber	
2	Marcel Buysse (BEL)	Peugeot-Wolber	+ 5' 58"
3	Gustave Garrigou (FRA)	Peugeot-Wolber	+ 31' 36"
4			
5			
6			
7			
8			
9			
10			

== Stage 7 ==
12 July 1913 — Luchon to Perpignan, 324 km (201 mi)

Stage 7 result

Rank	Rider	Team	Time
1	Marcel Buysse (BEL)	Peugeot-Wolber	11h 55' 40"
2	Paul Deman (BEL)	Automoto-Continental	+ 11' 22"
3	Philippe Thys (BEL)	Peugeot-Wolber	+ 12' 10"
4	Lucien Mazan (FRA)	Automoto-Continental	+ 24' 13"
5	Gustave Garrigou (FRA)	Peugeot-Wolber	+ 35' 59"
6	François Faber (LUX)	Peugeot-Wolber	+ 52' 37"
7	Jean Alavoine (FRA)	Peugeot-Wolber	s.t.
8	Eugène Christophe (FRA)	Peugeot-Wolber	s.t.
9	Firmin Lambot (BEL)	Griffon-Continental	s.t.
10	Alfons Spiessens (BEL)	JB Louvet-Continental	+ 1h 00' 50"

General classification after stage 7

Rank	Rider	Team	Time
1	Marcel Buysse (BEL)	Peugeot-Wolber	
2	Philippe Thys (BEL)	Peugeot-Wolber	+ 6' 12"
3	Gustave Garrigou (FRA)	Peugeot-Wolber	+ 1h 01' 37"
4			
5			
6			
7			
8			
9			
10			

== Stage 8 ==
14 July 1913 — Perpignan to Aix-en-Provence, 325 km (201.9 mi)

Stage 8 result

Rank	Rider	Team	Time
1	Gustave Garrigou (FRA)	Peugeot-Wolber	10h 42' 16"
2	Louis Petitjean (BEL)	Lone rider	+ 8"
3	François Faber (LUX)	Peugeot-Wolber	+ 45"
4	Jean Alavoine (FRA)	Peugeot-Wolber	+ 9' 04"
5	Lucien Mazan (FRA)	Automoto-Continental	s.t.
6	Marcel Buysse (BEL)	Peugeot-Wolber	s.t.
7	Philippe Thys (BEL)	Peugeot-Wolber	s.t.
8	Pierre Everaerts (BEL)	Lone rider	s.t.
9	Louis Trousselier (FRA)	JB Louvet-Continental	s.t.
10	Giuseppe Contesini (ITA)	Lone rider	s.t.

General classification after stage 8

Rank	Rider	Team	Time
1	Marcel Buysse (BEL)	Peugeot-Wolber	
2	Philippe Thys (BEL)	Peugeot-Wolber	+ 1' 12"
3	Gustave Garrigou (FRA)	Peugeot-Wolber	+ 47' 33"
4			
5			
6			
7			
8			
9			
10			
