= 1913 Tour de France, Stage 9 to Stage 15 =

Cycling race stages

Route of the 1913 Tour de France

The 1913 Tour de France was the 11th edition of Tour de France, one of cycling's Grand Tours. The Tour began in Paris on 29 June and Stage 9 occurred on 15 July with a flat stage from Aix-en-Provence. The race finished in Paris on 27 July.

== Stage 9 ==
15 July 1913 — Aix-en-Provence to Nice, 356 km (221 mi)

Stage 9 result

| Rank | Rider | Team | Time |
|---|---|---|---|
| 1 | Firmin Lambot (BEL) | Griffon-Continental | 13h 34' 26" |
| 2 | Joseph Van Daele (BEL) | JB Louvet-Continental | + 10' 22" |
| 3 | Philippe Thys (BEL) | Peugeot-Wolber | + 15' 09" |
| 4 | Lucien Mazan (FRA) | Automoto-Continental | + 17' 32" |
| 5 | Émile Engel (FRA) | Peugeot-Wolber | + 34' 18" |
| 6 | Gustave Garrigou (FRA) | Peugeot-Wolber | + 36' 08" |
| 7 | Louis Trousselier (FRA) | JB Louvet-Continental | s.t. |
| 8 | Camillo Bertarelli (ITA) | Lone rider | + 40' 52" |
| 9 | François Faber (LUX) | Peugeot-Wolber | + 49' 58" |
| 10 | Pierre Everaert (FRA) | Lone rider | + 58' 32" |

General classification after stage 9

| Rank | Rider | Team | Time |
|---|---|---|---|
| 1 | Philippe Thys (BEL) | Peugeot-Wolber | |
| 2 | Gustave Garrigou (FRA) | Peugeot-Wolber | + 1h 07' 30" |
| 3 | Lucien Mazan (FRA) | Automoto-Continental | + 1h 09' 31" |
| 4 | | | |
| 5 | | | |
| 6 | | | |
| 7 | | | |
| 8 | | | |
| 9 | | | |
| 10 | | | |

== Stage 10 ==
17 July 1913 — Nice to Grenoble, 333 km (206.9 mi)

Stage 10 result

| Rank | Rider | Team | Time |
|---|---|---|---|
| 1 | François Faber (LUX) | Peugeot-Wolber | 13h 08' 37" |
| 2 | Gustave Garrigou (FRA) | Peugeot-Wolber | s.t. |
| 3 | Philippe Thys (BEL) | Peugeot-Wolber | + 13' 18" |
| 4 | Lucien Mazan (FRA) | Automoto-Continental | + 21' 46" |
| 5 | Firmin Lambot (BEL) | Griffon-Continental | + 21' 48" |
| 6 | Marcel Buysse (BEL) | Peugeot-Wolber | + 1h 07' 49" |
| 7 | Clemente Canepari (ITA) | JB Louvet-Continental | + 1h 10' 01" |
| 8 | Jean Alavoine (FRA) | Peugeot-Wolber | + 1h 12' 20" |
| 9 | Alfons Spiessens (BEL) | JB Louvet-Continental | s.t. |
| 10 | Camillo Bertarelli (ITA) | Lone rider | + 1h 17' 59" |

General classification after stage 10

| Rank | Rider | Team | Time |
|---|---|---|---|
| 1 | Philippe Thys (BEL) | Peugeot-Wolber | |
| 2 | Gustave Garrigou (FRA) | Peugeot-Wolber | + 54' 22" |
| 3 | Lucien Mazan (FRA) | Automoto-Continental | + 1h 18' 09" |
| 4 | | | |
| 5 | | | |
| 6 | | | |
| 7 | | | |
| 8 | | | |
| 9 | | | |
| 10 | | | |

== Stage 11 ==
19 July 1913 — Grenoble to Geneva, 325 km (202 mi)

Stage 11 result

| Rank | Rider | Team | Time |
|---|---|---|---|
| 1 | Marcel Buysse (BEL) | Peugeot-Wolber | 12h 01' 42" |
| 2 | Lucien Mazan (FRA) | Automoto-Continental | + 2' 50" |
| 3 | Philippe Thys (BEL) | Peugeot-Wolber | s.t. |
| 4 | Gustave Garrigou (FRA) | Peugeot-Wolber | + 17' 35" |
| 5 | Alfons Spiessens (BEL) | JB Louvet-Continental | + 30' 38" |
| 6 | Jean Alavoine (FRA) | Peugeot-Wolber | + 57' 24" |
| 7 | Firmin Lambot (BEL) | Griffon-Continental | s.t. |
| 8 | Paul Deman (BEL) | Automoto-Continental | + 1h 05' 42" |
| 9 | Joseph Van Daele (BEL) | JB Louvet-Continental | s.t. |
| 10 | Camillo Bertarelli (ITA) | Lone rider | + 1h 06' 36" |

General classification after stage 11

| Rank | Rider | Team | Time |
|---|---|---|---|
| 1 | Philippe Thys (BEL) | Peugeot-Wolber | |
| 2 | Gustave Garrigou (FRA) | Peugeot-Wolber | + 1h 09' 07" |
| 3 | Lucien Mazan (FRA) | Automoto-Continental | + 1h 18' 09" |
| 4 | | | |
| 5 | | | |
| 6 | | | |
| 7 | | | |
| 8 | | | |
| 9 | | | |
| 10 | | | |

== Stage 12 ==
21 July 1913 — Geneva to Belfort, 335 km (208 mi)

Stage 12 result

| Rank | Rider | Team | Time |
|---|---|---|---|
| 1 | Marcel Buysse (BEL) | Peugeot-Wolber | 12h 31' 02" |
| 2 | Lucien Mazan (FRA) | Automoto-Continental | + 1' 18" |
| 3 | Firmin Lambot (BEL) | Griffon-Continental | + 1' 22" |
| 4 | Philippe Thys (BEL) | Peugeot-Wolber | + 1' 23" |
| 5 | Émile Engel (FRA) | Peugeot-Wolber | + 3' 03" |
| 6 | Gustave Garrigou (FRA) | Peugeot-Wolber | + 5' 10" |
| 7 | Alfons Spiessens (BEL) | JB Louvet-Continental | s.t. |
| 8 | Camillo Bertarelli (ITA) | Lone rider | + 5' 16" |
| 9 | Eugène Christophe (FRA) | Peugeot-Wolber | + 5' 17" |
| 10 | Louis Trousselier (FRA) | JB Louvet-Continental | + 12' 09" |

General classification after stage 12

| Rank | Rider | Team | Time |
|---|---|---|---|
| 1 | Philippe Thys (BEL) | Peugeot-Wolber | |
| 2 | Gustave Garrigou (FRA) | Peugeot-Wolber | + 1h 12' 53" |
| 3 | Lucien Mazan (FRA) | Automoto-Continental | + 1h 18' 05" |
| 4 | | | |
| 5 | | | |
| 6 | | | |
| 7 | | | |
| 8 | | | |
| 9 | | | |
| 10 | | | |

== Stage 13 ==
23 July 1913 — Belfort to Longwy, 325 km (202 mi)

Stage 13 result

| Rank | Rider | Team | Time |
|---|---|---|---|
| 1 | François Faber (LUX) | Peugeot-Wolber | 11h 29' 23" |
| 2 | Lucien Mazan (FRA) | Automoto-Continental | + 1" |
| 3 | Alfons Spiessens (BEL) | JB Louvet-Continental | + 4' 16" |
| 4 | Gustave Garrigou (FRA) | Peugeot-Wolber | + 14' 38" |
| 5 | Philippe Thys (BEL) | Peugeot-Wolber | + 14' 53" |
| 6 | Eugène Christophe (FRA) | Peugeot-Wolber | + 42' 32" |
| 7 | Marcel Buysse (BEL) | Peugeot-Wolber | s.t. |
| 8 | Louis Petitjean (BEL) | Lone rider | + 55' 20" |
| 9 | Clemente Canepari (ITA) | JB Louvet-Continental | + 1h 04' 54" |
| 10 | Firmin Lambot (BEL) | Griffon-Continental | + 1h 17' 34" |

General classification after stage 13

| Rank | Rider | Team | Time |
|---|---|---|---|
| 1 | Philippe Thys (BEL) | Peugeot-Wolber | |
| 2 | Lucien Mazan (FRA) | Automoto-Continental | + 1h 03' 13" |
| 3 | Gustave Garrigou (FRA) | Peugeot-Wolber | + 1h 12' 38" |
| 4 | | | |
| 5 | | | |
| 6 | | | |
| 7 | | | |
| 8 | | | |
| 9 | | | |
| 10 | | | |

== Stage 14 ==
25 July 1913 — Longwy to Dunkerque, 393 km (244 mi)

Stage 14 result

| Rank | Rider | Team | Time |
|---|---|---|---|
| 1 | Marcel Buysse (BEL) | Peugeot-Wolber | 14h 21' 55" |
| 2 | Gustave Garrigou (FRA) | Peugeot-Wolber | s.t. |
| 3 | François Faber (LUX) | Peugeot-Wolber | + 4' 14" |
| 4 | Vincent D’Hulst (BEL) | Lone rider | + 30' 07" |
| 5 | Paul Deman (BEL) | Automoto-Continental | + 33' 57" |
| 6 | Joseph Van Daele (BEL) | JB Louvet-Continental | + 34' 40" |
| 7 | Alfons Spiessens (BEL) | JB Louvet-Continental | s.t. |
| 8 | Louis Coolsaet (BEL) | Lone rider | s.t. |
| 9 | Firmin Lambot (BEL) | Griffon-Continental | + 48' 38" |
| 10 | Louis Trousselier (FRA) | JB Louvet-Continental | + 54' 01" |

General classification after stage 14

| Rank | Rider | Team | Time |
|---|---|---|---|
| 1 | Philippe Thys (BEL) | Peugeot-Wolber | |
| 2 | Gustave Garrigou (FRA) | Peugeot-Wolber | + 8' 37" |
| 3 | Marcel Buysse (BEL) | Peugeot-Wolber | + 3h 35' 00" |
| 4 | | | |
| 5 | | | |
| 6 | | | |
| 7 | | | |
| 8 | | | |
| 9 | | | |
| 10 | | | |

== Stage 15 ==
27 July 1913 — Dunkerque to Paris, 340 km (210 mi)

Stage 15 result

| Rank | Rider | Team | Time |
|---|---|---|---|
| 1 | Marcel Buysse (BEL) | Peugeot-Wolber | 12h 01' 37" |
| 2 | Émile Engel (FRA) | Peugeot-Wolber | + 1' 17" |
| 3 | François Faber (LUX) | Peugeot-Wolber | + 4' 05" |
| 4 | Gustave Garrigou (FRA) | Peugeot-Wolber | s.t. |
| 5 | Philippe Thys (BEL) | Peugeot-Wolber | s.t. |
| 6 | Joseph Van Daele (BEL) | JB Louvet-Continental | s.t. |
| 7 | Firmin Lambot (BEL) | Griffon-Continental | + 9' 03" |
| 8 | Eugène Christophe (FRA) | Peugeot-Wolber | + 16' 04" |
| 9 | Paul Deman (BEL) | Automoto-Continental | + 22' 59" |
| 10 | Jules Deloffre (FRA) | Lone rider | + 35' 23" |

General classification after stage 15

| Rank | Rider | Team | Time |
|---|---|---|---|
| 1 | Philippe Thys (BEL) | Peugeot-Wolber | 197h 54' 00" |
| 2 | Gustave Garrigou (FRA) | Peugeot-Wolber | + 8' 37" |
| 3 | Marcel Buysse (BEL) | Peugeot-Wolber | + 3h 30' 55" |
| 4 | Firmin Lambot (BEL) | Griffon-Continental | + 4h 12' 45" |
| 5 | François Faber (LUX) | Peugeot-Wolber | + 6h 26' 04" |
| 6 | Alfons Spiessens (BEL) | JB Louvet-Continental | + 7h 57' 52" |
| 7 | Eugène Christophe (FRA) | Peugeot-Wolber | + 14h 06' 35" |
| 8 | Camillo Bertarelli (ITA) | Lone rider | + 16h 21' 38" |
| 9 | Joseph Van Daele (BEL) | JB Louvet-Continental | + 16h 39' 53" |
| 10 | Émile Engel (FRA) | Peugeot-Wolber | + 16h 52' 34" |
