= 1913 Tour of Flanders =

Race details
- Dates: 25 May 1913
- Stages: 1
- Distance: 324 km (201 mi)
- Winning time: 12h 03' 10"

Results
	Winner	Paul Deman (BEL)	(Automoto)
	Second	Joseph Van Daele (BEL)	(JB Louvet)
	Third	Victor Doms (BEL)	(Automoto)

The first edition of the Tour of Flanders, a cycling race in Belgium, was held on 25 May 1913. Paul Deman won the event in a five-man sprint before Joseph Van Daele and Victor Doms. The event was created by sports journalist Karel Van Wijnendaele and organized by sports newspaper Sportwereld.

The event started in Ghent and finished in Mariakerke, on the outskirts of Ghent, covering a distance of 324 kilometres (201.3 miles). It finished on the velodrome of Mariakerke, a wooden track built around a pond, with four final laps before the official finish. 37 riders started the race, there were 16 classified finishers.

== Route ==
The race started in Ghent, East Flanders, before heading eastward to Sint-Niklaas and making a clockwise circle along Aalst, Oudenaarde, Kortrijk and Veurne. Subsequently, the course followed the North Seashore until Ostend and headed east via Roeselare back to Ghent. With this route, the race addressed all the major cities of the two western provinces of Flanders. With a total distance of 324 kilometres (201.3 miles), it was the event's longest edition ever. There were no categorized climbs.

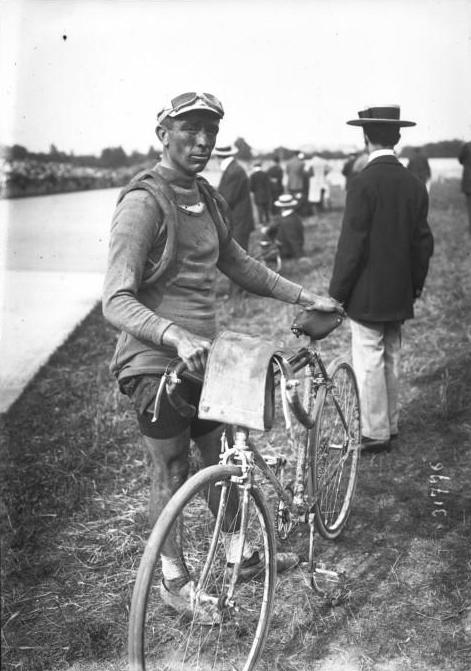
Paul Deman (pictured at the 1913 Tour de France) won the inaugural Tour of Flanders.

== Results ==
	Cyclist	Team	Time
1	Paul Deman (BEL)	Automoto	12h 03' 10"
2	Joseph Van Daele (BEL)	J.B.Louvet	s.t.
3	Victor Doms (BEL)	Automoto	s.t.
4	August Dierickx (BEL)		s.t.
5	Arthur Maertens (BEL)	La Française	s.t.
6	Jan Van Ingelghem (BEL)	Peugeot-Wolber	+ 1' 00"
7	Achille Depauw (BEL)	Liberator-Hutchinson	+ 1' 00"
8	Auguste Benoît (BEL)	La Française	+ 6' 50"
9	Adrien Kranskens (BEL)		+ 17' 50"
10	Hector Billiet (BEL)		+ 17' 50"
