= Arthur Maertens =

Belgian cyclist (1892–1962)

Personal information
- Full name: Arthur Josephus Maertens
- Born: 11 July 1892 Zwevezele, Belgium
- Died: 27 December 1962 (aged 70) Zwevezele, Belgium
- Weight: 81 kg (179 lb)

Cycling career
- Sport: Cycling
- Disciplines: Road; Track
- Role: Rider

Professional teams
- 1911–1914: La Française-Diamant
- 1919–1920: Individual

Arthur Josephus Maertens (later Arthur Martens; 11 July 1892 – 27 December 1962) was a Belgian track and road cyclist, café owner and bicycle frame builder. He competed professionally before the First World War and finished fifth in the inaugural Tour of Flanders in 1913.

== Biography ==
Maertens was born in Zwevezele, West Flanders, the son of Ferdinand Maertens and Sidonia Vandenberghe. He began racing at a young age, while his younger brothers Florent Maertens and René Maertens also became competitive cyclists.

He turned professional in 1911 with the French La Française-Diamant team, alongside leading riders such as Cyrille Van Hauwaert, Eugène Christophe and Octave Lapize.

His strongest season came in 1913 competing in main international cycling monuments, although it was also marked by misfortune. Maertens was one of the 37 starters in the 1913 inaugural edition of the Tour of Flanders. He was part of the leading breakaway and at one kilometre before the finish he rode away with Auguste Dierickx. However, he crashed entering the velodrome at Mariakerke. He eventually finishing fifth behind Paul Deman, Joseph Van Daele, Victor Doms and Auguste Dierickx.

Maertens also participated that year at the 1913 Paris–Roubaix. Also riding in the front group, he fell 20 kilomters before the finish after his frame broke. With his team he also rode the at the 1913 Tour de France, but after team leader Octave Lapize withdrew, the La Française squad left the Tour.

In 1913, Maertens also achieved success in track cycling, winning team races at Torhout, Brussels–Karreveld and Meulebeke, while finishing second at Gentbrugge and Gent–Mariakerke.

The outbreak of the World War I brought his professional cycling career to an abrupt end. After the war he briefly returned to racing as an independent rider, achieving only limited success.

In 1914 he married Irma Vermeulen of Ardooie and opened a café and bicycle workshop in Hille, near Zwevezele. During the 1930s he began manufacturing bicycle frames. After the World War II, the workshop was continued by his son Maurits Martens, who modernised the business. In 1980 his grandson Eddy Martens took over and renamed the company "Martelly Professional Frames"ka, which became known for producing custom racing bicycle frames for Belgian professional cyclists.

== Major results ==
1913
5th Tour of Flanders
2nd Kampioenschap van Vlaanderen
1st Torhout (track)
1st Brussels–Karreveld (track)
1st Meulebeke (track)
2nd Gentbrugge (track)
2nd Gent–Mariakerke (track)

1920
10th Kampioenschap van Vlaanderen

=== Grand Tour and Classic results timeline ===
Race	1912	1913	1914	1919
Tour de France	—	DNF	—	—
Tour of Flanders	Not held	5	—	14
Paris–Roubaix	26	DNF	33	—
Paris–Tours	—	37	—	—
