= De Drie Zustersteden =

Road cycling race in Belgium

Race details
- Date: July
- Region: Flanders
- English name: The Three Sister Cities
- Discipline: Road
- Competition: UCI Europe Tour
- Type: One-day race

History
- First edition: 1919
- Editions: 60
- Final edition: 2012
- First winner: Alfons Spiessens (BEL)
- Most wins: Peter Van Hoof (BEL) (3 wins)
- Final winner: Daniel McLay (GBR)

De Drie Zustersteden was a one-day road cycling race held annually around Dendermonde and Willebroek, Belgium between 1919 and 2012. It was held as a 1.2 event on the UCI Europe Tour from 2005 to 2008.

== Winners ==
Year	Winner	Second	Third
1919	(Belgium) Alfons Spiessens	(Belgium) Jules Van Hevel	(Belgium) Albert Dejonghe
1920	(Belgium) Isidoor Mechant	(Belgium) Marcel Buysse	(Belgium) Albert De Belder
1921	(Belgium) René Vermandel	(Belgium) Adolphe Coppez	(Belgium) Alfons Van Hecke
1922	(Belgium) Alfons Standaert	(Belgium) Maurice De Waele	(Belgium) Marcel Buysse
1923	(Belgium) Jules Van Hevel	(Belgium) Hilaire Hellebaut	(Belgium) Leon Devos
1924	(Belgium) Leon Devos	(Belgium) Maurice De Waele	(Belgium) Adolf Van Bruaene
1928	(Belgium) Joseph Dervaes	(Belgium) Jules Deschepper	(Belgium) Aime Dossche
1929	(Belgium) Joseph Dervaes	(Belgium) Jules Deschepper	(Belgium) August Mortelmans
1930	(Belgium) André Verbist	(Belgium) Armand Van Bruaene	(Belgium) Jules Goedhuys
1936	(Belgium) Leopold Van Den Bossche	(Belgium) Petrus Van Theemsche	(Belgium) Michel D'Hooghe
1937	(Belgium) Adolf Braeckeveldt	(Belgium) Jerome Dufromont	(Belgium) Gustaaf Deloor
1938	(Belgium) Albert Rosseel	(Belgium) Constant Lauwers	(Belgium) Alfons Deloor
1939	(Belgium) Frans Van Hassel	(Belgium) Roger Gyselinck	(Belgium) Karel Van Stickelen
1941	(Belgium) Joseph Somers	(Belgium) Odiel Van Den Meerschaut	(Belgium) Emiel Faignaert
1942	(Belgium) Odiel Van Den Meerschaut	(Belgium) Gustaaf Van Overloop	(Belgium) André Defoort
1943	(Belgium) Robert Van Eenaeme	(Belgium) Prosper Depredomme	(Belgium) Ward Van Dijck
1944	(Belgium) Odiel Van Den Meerschaut	(Belgium) Marcel Rijckaert	(Belgium) Camille Dekuysscher
1945	(Belgium) Gustaaf Bonvarlez	(Belgium) André Maelbrancke	(Belgium) Emiel Faignaert
1946	(Belgium) Roger De Corte	(Belgium) Jerome Dufromont	(Belgium) Gustaaf Van Overloop
1947	(Belgium) Maurice Desimpelaere	(Belgium) Corneille De Coster	(Belgium) Albert Paepe
1948	(Belgium) Ernest Sterckx	(Belgium) Raymond De Smedt	(Belgium) Marcel Rijckaert
1949	(Belgium) René Walschot	(Belgium) Henri Van Kerckhove	(Belgium) Ernest Sterckx
1950	(Belgium) René Walschot	(Belgium) Valere Ollivier	(Belgium) René Oreel
1951	(Belgium) Jos De Feyter	(Belgium) Ernest Sterckx	(Belgium) Albert Ramon
1952	(Belgium) Gerard Buyl	(Belgium) Jan Adriaensens	(Belgium) Omer Braekevelt
1953	(Belgium) Karel De Baere	(Belgium) Martin Van Geneugden	(Belgium) Gaston De Wachter
1954	(Belgium) Jozef Schils	(Belgium) René Mertens	(Belgium) Willy Vannitsen
1955	(Belgium) Willy Vannitsen	(Belgium) Stan Ockers	(Belgium) Gerard Buyl
1956	(Belgium) Rik Van Looy	(Belgium) Martin Van Geneugden	(Belgium) André Rosseel
1957	(Belgium) Gilbert Desmet	(Belgium) Joseph Planckaert	(Belgium) André Vlayen
1958	(Belgium) Roger Baens	(Belgium) Jozef Schils	(Belgium) Roger De Corte
1960	(Belgium) Willy Schroeders	(Belgium) Joseph Planckaert	(Belgium) Guillaume Van Tongerloo
1961	(Netherlands) Jo de Haan	(Belgium) Gustaaf Van Vaerenbergh	(Belgium) Frans Schoubben
1962	(France) Jean Stablinski	(Belgium) Gilbert Desmet	(Belgium) Victor Van Schil
1963	(Belgium) Joseph Verachtert	(Belgium) Gustaaf De Smet	(Belgium) Jos Wouters
1988	(Belgium) Edwig Van Hooydonck	(Netherlands) Jelle Nijdam	(Netherlands) Frans Maassen
1989	(Netherlands) Jean Paul van Poppel	(Netherlands) Frank Pirard	(Netherlands) Adri van der Poel
1990 (1)	(Belgium) Rik Van Slycke	(Netherlands) Michel Cornelisse	(Belgium) Bruno Geuens
1990 (2)	(Belgium) Patrick Van Roosbroeck	(Netherlands) Aart Vierhouten	(Netherlands) Niels Van Elzakker
1991	(Belgium) Sebastian Van Den Abeele	(Belgium) Guy Rooms	(Belgium) Frank Francken
1992	(Belgium) Michel Van Haecke	(Belgium) Wim Omloop	(Lithuania) Vladimir Muravskis
1993	(Belgium) Peter Van Hoof	(Netherlands) Patrick Wouters	(Belgium) Johan Buelens
1994	(Belgium) Carl Roes	(Belgium) Greg Moens	(Denmark) Frank Høj
1995	(Belgium) Dirk D'Haemers	(Denmark) Ken Westergaard	(Netherlands) Willem-Jan Lambregts
1996	(Belgium) Stive Vermaut	(Belgium) Peter Van Hoof	(Netherlands) Eddy Schurer
1997	(Belgium) Peter Van Hoof	(Russia) Vadim Volar	(Belgium) Gert-Jan Van Immerseel
1998	(Belgium) Peter Van Hoof	(Netherlands) Wilfried Bastiaanse	(Belgium) Stefaan Vermeersch
1999	(Belgium) Wim Pauwels	(Belgium) Gunther Cuylits	(Belgium) Gianni David
2000	(Belgium) Arne Daelmans	(Netherlands) André Van De Reep	(New Zealand) Tim Carswell
2001	(Australia) Paul Redenbach	(United Kingdom) Dean Downing	(Belgium) Stefan Grimon
2002	(Belgium) Danny Van Looy	(Netherlands) Sandro Bijnen	(Belgium) Tom De Meyer
2003	(Belgium) Steven Caethoven	(New Zealand) Jaaron Poad	(Belgium) Danny In 't Ven
2004	(Australia) Phil Thuaux	(Belgium) Kenny Lisabeth	(Belgium) Jarno Vanfrachem
2005	(Belgium) Peter Wuyts	(United Kingdom) Hamish Robert Haynes	(Belgium) Jurgen Van Roosbroeck
2006	(Netherlands) Ger Soepenberg	(Belgium) Bert De Waele	(Belgium) Bjorn Coomans
2007	(Belgium) Bert De Waele	(Belgium) Kevyn Ista	(Belgium) Nicky Cocquyt
2008	(Belgium) Nicky Cocquyt	(Australia) Mitchell Docker	(Netherlands) Wouter Mol
2009	(Lithuania) Gediminas Bagdonas	(Netherlands) Peter van Agtmaal	(Lithuania) Simas Kondrotas
2010	(Belgium) Timothy Stevens	(Belgium) Kurt Van Goidsenhoven	(New Zealand) Clinton Robert Avery
2011	(Belgium) Timothy Stevens	(Belgium) Kurt Diels	(Belgium) Dries Vannevel
2012	(United Kingdom) Daniel McLay	(Netherlands) Tim Kerkhof	(Belgium) Laurent Donnay
