= 1912 Giro di Lombardia =

Race details
- Dates: 27 October 1912
- Stages: 1
- Distance: 235 km (146.0 mi)
- Winning time: 7h 30' 30"

Results
	Winner	Carlo Oriani (ITA)
	Second	Enrico Verde (ITA)
	Third	Maurice Brocco (FRA)

The 1912 Giro di Lombardia was the eighth edition of the Giro di Lombardia cycle race and was held on 27 October 1912. The race started in Milan and finished in Sesto San Giovanni. The race was won by Carlo Oriani.

== General classification ==
Final general classification

Rank	Rider	Team	Time
1	Carlo Oriani (ITA)	Stucchi	7h 30' 30"
2	Enrico Verde (ITA)	Maino	+ 0"
3	Maurice Brocco (FRA)		+ 0"
4	Leopoldo Torricelli (ITA)	Maino	+ 0"
5	Ugo Agostoni (ITA)		+ 0"
6	Vincenzo Borgarello (ITA)	Legnano	+ 1' 10"
7	Pierino Albini (ITA)		+ 2' 19"
8	Clemente Canepari (ITA)	Legnano	+ 2' 19"
9	Costante Girardengo (ITA)	Maino	+ 18' 53"
10	Camillo Bertarelli (ITA)	Bianchi	+ 18' 53"
