= 1914 Tour of Flanders =

2nd Tour of Flanders
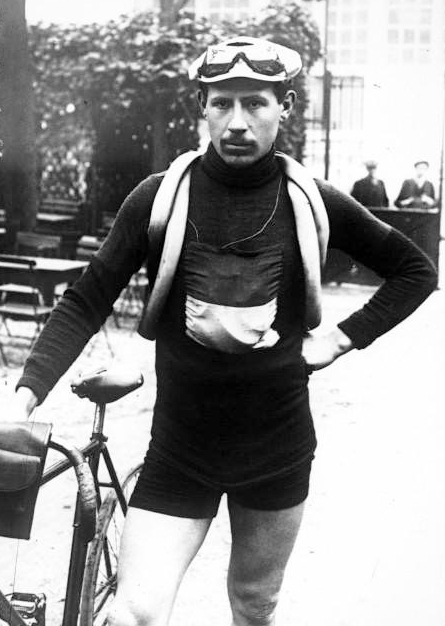
- Marcel Buysse, winner of the second Tour of Flanders in 1914

Race details
- Dates: 22 March 1914
- Stages: 1
- Distance: 280 km (170 mi)
- Winning time: 10h 20'

Results
	Winner	Marcel Buysse (BEL)	(Alcyon-Soly)
	Second	Henri Van Lerberghe (BEL)	(Liberator)
	Third	Pierre Van De Velde (BEL)	(Flandria–Carpenter)

The second running of the Tour of Flanders cycling race in Belgium was held on Sunday, 22 March 1914. Belgian Marcel Buysse won the race in a sprint of a seven-strong group on the velodrome of Evergem, part of Ghent. 19 of 47 riders finished. The race started and finished in Ghent.

== Route ==
The race started in Ghent, East Flanders, before heading eastward to Sint-Niklaas and making a clockwise circle along Aalst, Oudenaarde, Kortrijk, Veurne and Roeselare. The race finished back in Ghent – for a total distance of 280 km. With this route, the race addressed all the major cities of the two western provinces of Flanders. The course was similar to the previous edition's, but organizers had cancelled the leg to the coast in order to scale down the distance to 284 km. There were no categorized climbs.

== Race summary ==
Henri Van Lerberghe was caught by nine riders after a long solo breakaway. Despite late breakaway attempts by Marcel Buysse, Van Lerberghe and Vandevelde, the race ended in a sprint on the wooden outdoor velodrome of Evergem. Van Lerberghe went high in the bend and Buysse, an experienced track rider, dove in the gap and powered on to victory.

== Background ==
The stars of Belgian cycling at the time – notably Cyrille Van Hauwaert, Odile Defraye, Louis Mottiat and Jules Masselis – did not participate in the event, because their French teams had forbidden Belgian riders to enter. However, there were hints of the growing status of the race as a symbol of Flemish nationalism and Marcel Buysse, one of Flanders' cycling icons in the early 20th century, had promised organizers he would start. Buysse insisted on entering the race, against the instructions of his Alcyon team, and won the second edition, much to the content of fans and organizers.

It was the last Tour of Flanders before the race was suspended for five years because of World War I. As from 1919 the event has been organized without interruptions.

== Results ==
Result
Rank	Rider	Team	Time
1	Marcel Buysse (BEL)	Alcyon-Soly	10h 20' 00"
2	Henri Van Lerberghe (BEL)	Liberator	s.t.
3	Pierre Van De Velde (BEL)	-	s.t.
4	Aloïs Persyn (BEL)	-	s.t.
5	Achille Depauw (BEL)	-	s.t.
6	August Dierickx (BEL)	-	s.t.
7	Georges Monseur (BEL)	La Française-Hutchinson	s.t.
8	Alfons Spiessens (BEL)	J.B.Louvet-Continental	s.t.
9	Auguste Benoît (BEL)	J.B.Louvet-Continental	+ 2' 00"
10	Julien Tuytten (BEL)	-	+ 8' 00"
