= 1919 Liège–Bastogne–Liège =

Race details
- Dates: 28 September 1919
- Stages: 1
- Distance: 237 km (147 mi)
- Winning time: 9h 20' 30"

Results
	Winner	Léon Devos (BEL)
	Second	Henri Hanlet (BEL)
	Third	Arthur Claerhout (BEL)

The 1919 Liège–Bastogne–Liège was the ninth edition of the Liège–Bastogne–Liège cycle race and was held on 28 September 1919. The race started and finished in Liège. The race was won by Léon Devos.

== General classification ==
Final general classification

Rank	Rider	Time
1	Léon Devos (BEL)	9h 20' 30"
2	Henri Hanlet (BEL)	+ 2' 30"
3	Arthur Claerhout (BEL)	+ 6' 30"
4	Alfons Van Hecke (BEL)	+ 12' 40"
5	Camille Leroy (BEL)	+ 12' 40"
6	Louis Heusghem (BEL)	+ 12' 40"
