= 1922 Paris–Roubaix =

Cycling race

Race details
- Dates: 16 April 1922
- Stages: 1
- Distance: 262 km (163 mi)
- Winning time: 7h 47' 00"

Results
	Winner	Albert Dejonghe (BEL)
	Second	Jean Rossius (BEL)
	Third	Émile Masson (BEL)

The 1922 Paris–Roubaix was the 23rd edition of the Paris–Roubaix, a classic one-day cycle race in France. The single day event was held on 16 April 1922 and stretched 262 km (163 mi) from Paris to its end in a velodrome in Roubaix. The winner was Albert Dejonghe from Belgium.

== Results ==
Final results (1–10)
Rank	Cyclist	Time
1	Albert Dejonghe (BEL)	7h 47' 00″
2	Jean Rossius (BEL)	+6' 00″
3	Émile Masson (BEL)	+6' 00″
4	Paul Deman (BEL)	+8' 00″
5	Charles Lacquehay (FRA)	+10' 00″
6	Gaetano Belloni (ITA)	+11' 30″
7	Alfons Van Hecke (BEL)	+11' 30″
8	Léon Scieur (BEL)	+13' 30″
9	Marcel Gobillot (FRA)	+13' 30″
10	Henri Pélissier (FRA)	+13' 30″
