= Jules Vanhevel =

Belgian cyclist

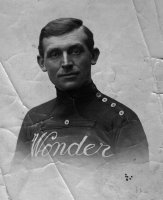
- Jules Vanhevel, racing for the French brand Wonder

Personal information
- Full name: Jules Vanhevel
- Born: 10 March 1895 Koekelare, Belgium
- Died: 21 July 1969 (aged 74) Ostend, Belgium

Cycling career
- Sport: Cycling
- Discipline: Road
- Role: Rider

Professional teams
- 1921-1923: Team Bianchi Dunlop
- 1923-1924: Team Cycles M.Buysse-Colonial
- 1924-1925: Team Wonder-Russel
- 1925-1926: Team Wonder
- 1926-1927: Team Ravat-Wonder-Dunlop
- 1927-1930: Team Opel ZR-III

Major wins
- One-day races and Classics National Road Race Championships (1920, 1921) Tour of Flanders (1920) Paris-Roubaix (1924) Kampioenschap van Vlaanderen (1919, 1920) Omloop der Vlaamse Gewesten (1928)

Jules Vanhevel (10 March 1895 in Koekelare – 21 July 1969 in Ostend) was a Belgian racing cyclist. He was a professional from 1919 to 1936.

== Biography ==
In the literature, his name is often misspelled as "Jules Van Hevel. The cyclist Jules A. Vanhevel should not be confused with Jules K. Vanhevel, the last miller of the East Mill at Gistel, a relative

Jules Vanhevel his first racing bike was a Bercley.

== Record as beginner ==
1913

- 1st "The First Step" at Brussels
- 1st Harelbeke-Gent Harelbeke-
- 1st Tielt

== Record as independent ==
1914

- 1st Coast of Circulation
- 3rd Grand Prix Brussels
- 1st Grand Prix Merkem
- 1st Evergem-Oostende Evergem-
- 1st Grand Prix Franco-Belge

== Record in the war / in military service ==
Jules Vanhevel served as a cyclist in the 1st Artillery Regiment and later in the trench mortars Van Doren of the 1st Army Division. He was injured and was sent to England ill.

1917

- Molinari Cup 1st Stamford Bridge

1918

- Molinari Cup 1st Stamford Bridge
- 1st Gravelines

1919

- 1st Grand Prix Mechelen

== Record as a professional ==
1919

- 3rd Tour of Flanders
- (interruption cycling career in the Army in Germany))
- (Statement) Tour of Battlefields Strasbourg-Luxembourg-Brussels-Amiens (2nd in the 1st round, 2nd round and 5th in the list in the 3rd round)
- 3rd Tour of Belgium (2nd in the 1st round, 3rd in the 3rd round, 2nd in the 4th and 6th in the 5th round trip)
- (discharge from military service)

1st Championship of Flanders

- 1st Circuit Veurne-Ambacht
- 1st Ichtegem

1920

- 1st National Road Race Championships
- 1st Tour of Flanders
- 5th Paris–Roubaix
- 4th Milano–Torino-
- (abandon) Tour of Belgium (1st in the 1st round, 10th in the 2nd round and declared in the 3rd round by accident)

1st Championship of Flanders

- 3rd Six Days of New York (with Henri Van Lerberghe)

1921 Team Bianchi Dunlop

- 1st National Road Race Championships
- 2nd Tour of Flanders
- 3rd Tour of Belgium (6th in the 1st round, 1st in the 2nd round, 2nd in the 3rd round, 3rd in the 4th round, 2nd in the 5th round)
- 2nd Grand Prix Duffel
- (abandon) Tour of Italy 5th in the 2nd round)
- 4th Six Days of New York (by Marcel Buyze)

1922

- 1st Tour of West Flanders
- 8th Six Days of Paris (by Marcel Buyze)

1923 Team Cycles M.Buysse-Colonial

- 4th Tour of Flanders
- 1st Circuit Nieuwpoort
- 1st De Drie Zustersteden Antwerp-Torhout
- 2nd Schaal Sels
- 1st Den Haag - Arnhem - Den Haag
- 1st Balgerhoeke
- 1st Grand Prix Brasschaat
- 1st Critérium des As
- 5th Belgian National Road Race Championships for elite
- 1st Six Days of Brussels, (with Cesar Debaets)
- 9th Six Days of Paris (with Cesar Debaets)
- 11th Six Days of Ghent (by Marcel Buyze)

1924 Team Wonder-Russel

- 1st Paris–Roubaix
- 1st Circuit Paris
- 1st Critérium des As
- 5th Tour of Flanders
- 3rd Blankenberge
- 2nd Six Days of Ghent (with Lucien Buysse)

1925 Team Wonder

- 3rd Paris–Roubaix
- 3rd Giro della Provincia Milano (with Gerard Debaets) (2nd test on the slopes, on his Australian 2nd, 4th on the road)
- 1st Six Days of Ghent (with Cesar Debaets)

1926 Team Ravat-Wonder-Dunlop and team Opel=Pollack

- 1st Circuit du Littoral
- 2nd Berlin-Hanover-Berlin
- 2nd Circuit Stuttgart
- 2nd Circuit Cologne
- 3rd Tour of Frankfurt
- 3rd Championship of Germany
- 11th Circuit of Paris
- 27th Paris–Tours
- 3rd Six Days of Berlin (with Emile Aerts)
- 4th Six Days of Brussels (with Denis Verschueren)

1927 Team Opel ZR-III

- 1st Hanover - Bremen - Hannover
- 1st Berlin - Cottbus - Berlin
- 2nd Tour Frankfurt
- 2nd Around Cologne
- 2nd Württemberg Rundfahrt
- 1st Hulst

1928

- 1st Tour of Belgium (1st in the 1st round, 2nd in the 2nd round, 2nd and 3rd in the 3rd round in 4th ride)
- 1st Omloop der Vlaamse Gewesten
- 2nd Sachsen-Tour
- 3rd Six Days of Leipzig (with Oskar Tietz)
- 4th Six Days of Brussels (by Jules Verschelden)
- 6th Paris–Roubaix
- (abandon) World ( "But? ... It happened at Km. 80. Ronsse was in the lead. Van Hevel at his wheel. Before them, a harnessing of oxen. One of the animals and turn away again with -tail. Ronsse the lead, running alongside a rake ment. He comes over. Jules follows. At 'the moment he passes, the tail stutters — read carefully, dear reader — from the ox to the brake handle on the handlebar, with the result that Van Hevel as mercilessly as the substance is suddenly thrown. He was hurt, hands and legs, and the whole body.")

1929

- 3rd Six Days of Dortmund (with Rene Vermandel)

1930

- 1st Gistel

1931

- 1st Avelgem
- 8th UCI World Championships Road Race
- 2nd Six Days of Brussels (with Piet Van Kempen)
- 9th Six Days of Berlin (with Jean Van Buggenhout)

1932

- 1st Niel
- 4th Six Days of Brussels (with Leopold Haegelsteen)

1933

- 6th Six Days of Brussels (with Gustaaf Van Slembrouck)

1936

- 6th Six Days of Brussels (with Kees Pellenaars)

== Museum ==
In the ancient hostelry 'De Engel' at Ichtegem, of the family Maeckelbergh, one can admire a unique collection of Jules Vanhevel. Robert Maeckelbergh was the caretaker of Jules Vanhevel and married his sister Lea.
