= Charles Dumont =

Charles Dumont may refer to:

- Charles Dumont (cyclist) (1888–1951), Swiss cyclist
- Charles Dumont (politician) (1867–1939), French politician
- Charles Dumont (singer) (1929–2024), French singer and composer
- Charles Dumont de Sainte-Croix (1758–1830), French zoologist
