= 1916 Giro di Lombardia =

Race details
- Dates: 5 November 1916
- Stages: 1
- Distance: 232 km (144.2 mi)
- Winning time: 8h 41' 35"

Results
	Winner	Leopoldo Torricelli (ITA)
	Second	Camillo Bertarelli (ITA)
	Third	Alfredo Sivocci (ITA)

The 1916 Giro di Lombardia was the 12th edition of the Giro di Lombardia cycle race and was held on 5 November 1916. The race started in Milan and finished at Villa Torretta. The race was won by Leopoldo Torricelli of the Maino team.

== General classification ==
Final general classification

Rank	Rider	Team	Time
1	Leopoldo Torricelli (ITA)	Maino	8h 41' 35"
2	Camillo Bertarelli (ITA)	Ganna	+ 58"
3	Alfredo Sivocci (ITA)	Dei	+ 5' 22"
4	Angelo Vay (ITA)		+ 20' 48"
5	Arturo Ferrario (ITA)	Stucchi	+ 53' 00"
6	Costante Costa (ITA)		+ 53' 00"
7	Domenico Schierano (ITA)		+ 53' 00"
8	Clemente Canepari (ITA)	Stucchi	+ 1h 02' 50"
9	Telesforo Benaglia (ITA)		+ 1h 07' 25"
10	Ruggero Ferrario (ITA)		+ 1h 09' 35"
