= 1910 Paris–Tours =

Race details
- Dates: 25 September 1910
- Stages: 1
- Distance: 248 km (154 mi)
- Winning time: 7h 43' 28"

Results
	Winner	François Faber (LUX)
	Second	Louis Trousselier (FRA)
	Third	Émile Engel (FRA)

The 1910 Paris–Tours was the seventh edition of the Paris–Tours cycle race and was held on 25 September 1910. The race started in Paris and finished in Tours. The race was won by François Faber.

== General classification ==
Final general classification

Rank	Rider	Time
1	François Faber (LUX)	7h 43' 28"
2	Louis Trousselier (FRA)	+ 0"
3	Émile Engel (FRA)	+ 0"
4	Édouard Léonard (FRA)	+ 0"
5	Jean Alavoine (FRA)	+ 13' 00"
6	Andre Pottier (FRA)	+ 13' 00"
7	Eugène Dhers (FRA)	+ 13' 00"
8	Ernest Paul (FRA)	+ 14' 00"
9	Georges Tribouillard (FRA)	+ 14' 00"
10	Constant Niedergang (FRA)	+ 14' 00"
