= 1920 Tour of Flanders =

Race details
- Dates: 21 March 1920
- Stages: 1
- Distance: 248 km (154.1 mi)
- Winning time: 9h 30' 00"

Results
	Winner	Jules Vanhevel (BEL)
	Second	Albert Dejonghe (BEL)
	Third	Fons van Hecke (BEL)

The 1920 Tour of Flanders was the fourth edition of the Tour of Flanders road cycling one-day race and was held on 21 March 1920. The race was won by Jules Vanhevel.

== General classification ==
Final general classification

Rank	Rider	Team	Time
1	Jules van Hevel (BEL)		9h 30' 00"
2	Albert Dejonghe (BEL)		s.t.
3	Fons van Hecke (BEL)		+ 1' 00"
4	Émile Masson (BEL)		+ 11' 00"
5	Louis Mottiat (BEL)	La Sportive	s.t.
6	Henri Burghraeve (BEL)		+ 18' 00"
7	Arthur Van Branthegem (BEL)		s.t.
8	Urbain Anseeuw (BEL)	La Sportive	s.t.
9	Louis Budts (BEL)		s.t.
10	Isidoor Mechant (BEL)		+ 19' 30"
