= René Guénot =

French cyclist (1890–1965)

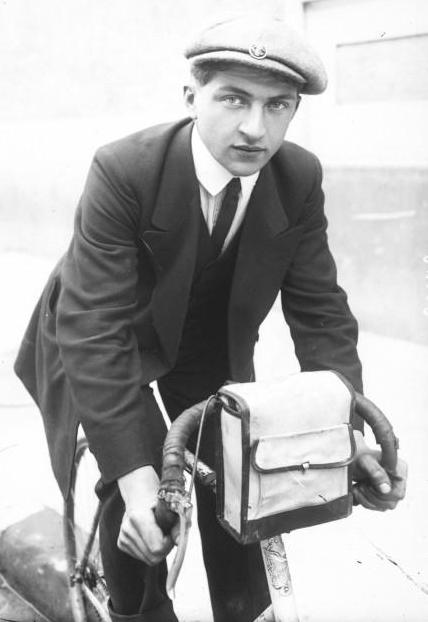

Personal information
- Full name: René Guénot
- Born: 8 November 1890 Saint-Boil, France
- Died: 6 May 1965 (aged 74) Gap, France

Cycling career
- Sport: Cycling
- Discipline: Road
- Role: Rider

Amateur team
- 1910–1912: Vélo Club de Levallois

Professional team
- 1913–1914: JB Louvet-Continental

René Guénot (8 November 1890 – 6 May 1965) was a French road racing cyclist. He notably won the 1910 Tour de France des Indépendants.

== Biography ==
He began his career with the club VC Levallois. In 1910, he obtained a licence as an independent cyclist and won the Tour de France des Indépendants in 1910, including winning four stages. A year later, he won Paris–Roubaix, also in the independent category. In 1913, he competed in the 1913 Tour de France for the JB Louvet team. In 1914, he won the one-day race Marseille–Lyon. The outbreak of World War I then ended his career. Guénot died on 6 May 1965 in Gap, aged 74.

== Major results ==
1910
1st Paris–Fontainebleau
1st overall Tour de France des indépendants

1st stage 4
1st stage 8
1st stage 12

1st Nice–Marseille
2nd Paris–Amboise
2nd Paris–Roubaix indépendants

1911
1st Paris–Roubaix indépendants
1st Dijon–Gray
1st Vichy–Nevers–Vichy

1912
1st Paris–Gien
1st Paris–Le Havre
2nd Luxembourg–Nancy

1913
1st Mâcon–Chalon–Mâcon
1st Circuit de l'Auxois

1914
1st Paris–Lyon
1st Marseille–Lyon
1st GP Sporting
