= Mariakerke =

Mariakerke may refer to:

- Mariakerke, East Flanders, a part of the city of Ghent
- Mariakerke, West Flanders, a part of the city of Ostend
