= 1919 Tour of Flanders =

Race details
- Dates: 23 March 1919
- Distance: 230 km (140 mi)
- Winning time: 7h 41' 18"

Results
	Winner	Henri Van Lerberghe (BEL)
	Second	Léon Buysse (BEL)
	Third	Jules Van Hevel (BEL)

The 1919 Tour of Flanders, the third edition of the Tour of Flanders road cycling race, was held on 23 March 1919 and was won by the Belgian Henri Van Lerberghe. Van Lerberghe broke clear at 120 km from the finish in a solo effort and maintained his lead to the finish. He finished 14 minutes ahead of the first group of chasers, the largest winning margin in the history of the race. Léon Buysse won the sprint for second place before Jules Van Hevel. The race started in the centre of Ghent and finished in Gentbrugge, on the outskirts of Ghent. The total distance was 230 kilometres (142.9 miles).

It was the first Tour of Flanders after a five-year hiatus due to the First World War. As from this edition, the Tour of Flanders has been organized annually, even during the Second World War; the longest uninterrupted streak of any cycling race.

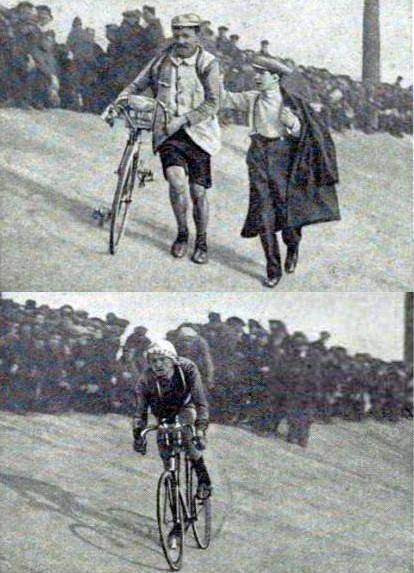
Finish of the race in Gentbrugge. Top picture: Henri Van Lerberghe walks over the finish. Bottom: Runner-up Léon Buysse.

== Race summary ==
Before the start of the race, Henri Van Lerberghe declared to the peloton that he was going to drop everyone and impose himself on the race alone. Van Lerberghe attacked into a headwind whilst there was still 120 km to be travelled, in what looked like an attack without any chance of success. During his breakaway, he saw an assistant with a bag of food planned for Marcel Buysse and convinced him that Buysse had abandoned, so as to take his food. Later, he had to pause at a level crossing as there was a train going past at the time. Van Lerberghe did not wait for the train to pass and decided to enter a train car with his bike to get out on the other side. He went on to reach the finish line with a margin of 14 minutes over the next placed rider, the largest margin in the history of the Tour of Flanders. After crossing the line and riding his lap of honour, Van Lerberghe declared to the crowd and, in all sincerity: "Go home; I'm half a day ahead of the pack."

== Results ==
Rank	Rider	Team	Time
1	Henri Van Lerberghe (BEL)	Legnano-Pirelli	7h 41' 18"
2	Léon Buysse (BEL)		+ 14'00
3	Jules Van Hevel (BEL)		s.t.
4	Frits Wiersma (NED)		s.t.
5	Albert Dejonghe (BEL)		s.t.
6	Aviel Cocquyt (BEL)		s.t.
7	Alois Verstraeten (BEL)	Bianchi-Pirelli	s.t.
8	Laurent Seret (BEL)		+ 21' 52"
9	Theodore Arvent (BEL)		+ 23' 00"
10	Basile Matthys (BEL)		s.t.
