= Achille Depauw =

Belgian cyclist

Personal information
- Born: 13 September 1885
- Died: 5 March 1966 (aged 80)

Cycling career
- Sport: Cycling
- Role: Rider

Achille Depauw also written as Achiel Depauw (13 September 1885 – 5 March 1966) was a Belgian racing cyclist. He rode in the 1923 Tour de France.

== Biography ==
Depauw competed in the Tour of Belgium for amateurs in 1906 and 1909. He started the 1910 Paris–Roubaix, finishing 31st.

In 1912, he finished eighth in Liège–Bastogne–Liège, followed by fifth place in Paris–Brussels in 1913.

Depauw competed in the 1913 Tour de France for the Liberator team. He was a member of the famous "Flandriens" team managed by Karel Steyaert, alongside Aloïs Persyn, César Debaets, Jules Van Hevel, Pierre Van De Velde, Henri Van Lerberghe, and the brothers Frederick and Henri Stockelynck. (Note: The "Flandriens" team consisted of Aloïs Persyn, César Debaets, Jules Van Hevel, Pierre Van De Velde, Henri Van Lerberghe, Frederick Stockelynck and Henri Stockelynck, under the management of Karel Steyaert.) The team enjoyed considerable success for many years in Madison races throughout Europe.

In 1914, he partnered Pierre Van De Velde in the Six Days of Paris, but the pair abandoned the race. He also competed in the Six Days of Brussels with Léon Buysse, finishing fifth.

During the First World War, Depauw served as a farrier in a regiment of lancers.

He was still competing in cycling events as late as 1932.
