= Henri Alavoine =

French cyclist

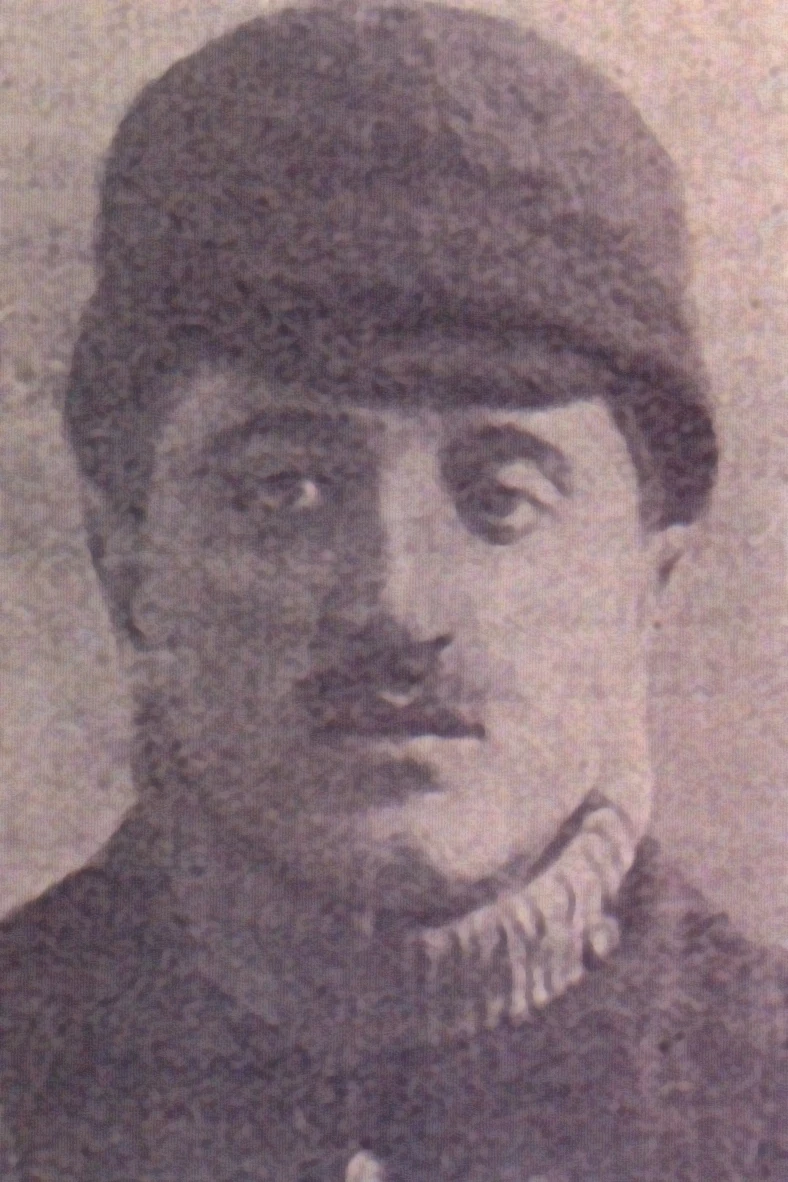
- Henri Alavoine in the 1910s

Personal information
- Full name: Henri Alavoine
- Born: 6 March 1890 Paris, France
- Died: 19 July 1916 (aged 26) Pau, France

Cycling career
- Sport: Cycling
- Role: Rider

Henri Alavoine (6 March 1890 – 19 July 1916) was a French racing cyclist. He finished in last place in the 1913 Tour de France.
