= Albert Dejonghe =

Belgian cyclist

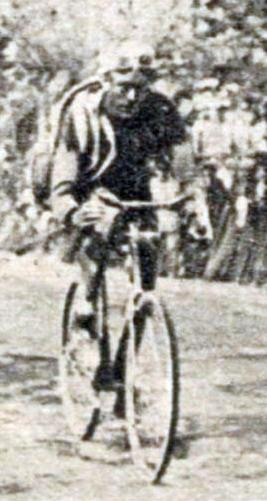

Personal information
- Full name: Albert Dejonghe
- Born: 14 February 1894 Middelkerke, Belgium
- Died: 23 February 1981 (aged 87) Middelkerke, Belgium

Cycling career
- Sport: Cycling
- Discipline: Road
- Role: Rider

Major wins
- Grand Tours Tour de France 1 individual stage (1923) One-day races and Classics Paris–Roubaix (1922)

Albert Dejonghe (14 February 1894 – 23 February 1981) was a Belgian professional road bicycle racer. He won Paris–Roubaix in 1922, one stage in the 1923 Tour de France and finished 5th and 6th in the 1925 and 1926 Tour de France.

== Career ==
In 1919 following The Great War a race was held touring the battlefields of Belgium, Luxembourg and France. Dejonghe won stage two of the race but did not end up placing highly overall. In 1922 Dejonghe won Paris–Roubaix a cycling monument. He is one of two cyclists to ever win the prestigious race while sporting a mustache.

== Major results ==
1913
3rd Tour of Belgium
1919
1st Stage 2 Circuit des Champs de Bataille
2nd Retinne - Marche - Retinne
3rd Bordeaux–Paris
3rd De Drie Zustersteden
1920
2nd Tour of Flanders
2nd Retinne - Spa - Retinne
2nd Overall Tour of Belgium
3rd Paris–Tours
1921
7th Liège–Bastogne–Liège
1922
1st Paris–Roubaix
1923
1st Stage 4 Tour de France
3rd Tour of Flanders
1925
5th Overall Tour de France
1926
1st Paris - Angers, Angers
6th Overall Tour de France
