= Arthur Claerhout =

Belgian cyclist

Personal information
- Born: 3 December 1887
- Died: 22 February 1978 (aged 90)

Cycling career
- Sport: Cycling
- Role: Rider

Arthur Claerhout (3 December 1887 – 22 February 1978) was a Belgian racing cyclist. He rode in the 1920 Tour de France.
