= Constant Niedergang =

French cyclist (1884–1973)

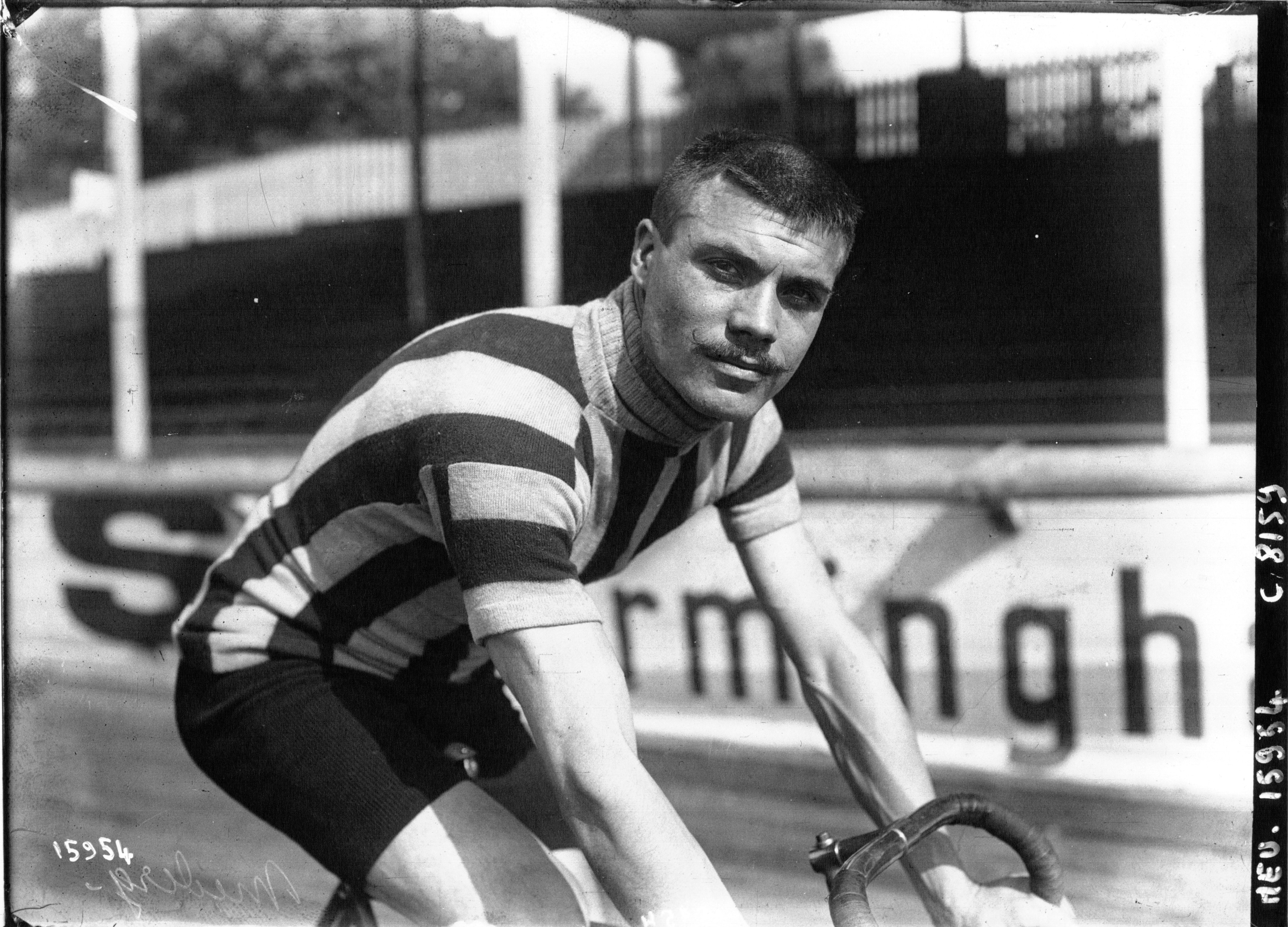
- Niedergang in 1911

Personal information
- Born: 15 September 1884 Roubaix, France
- Died: 19 March 1973 (aged 88) Roubaix, France
- Height: 1.68 m (5 ft 6 in)
- Weight: 70 kg (154 lb)

Cycling career
- Sport: Cycling
- Disciplines: Road; Track
- Role: Rider

Professional team
- 1911-1914: Automoto

Constant Niedergang (15 September 1884 – 19 March 1973) was a French track and road racing cyclist who competed professionally between 1911 and 1914. He rode three editions of the Tour de France and recorded top-10 finishes in several cycling monuments, including Paris–Roubaix and Paris–Tours and on the track in the Bol d'Or.

== Biography ==
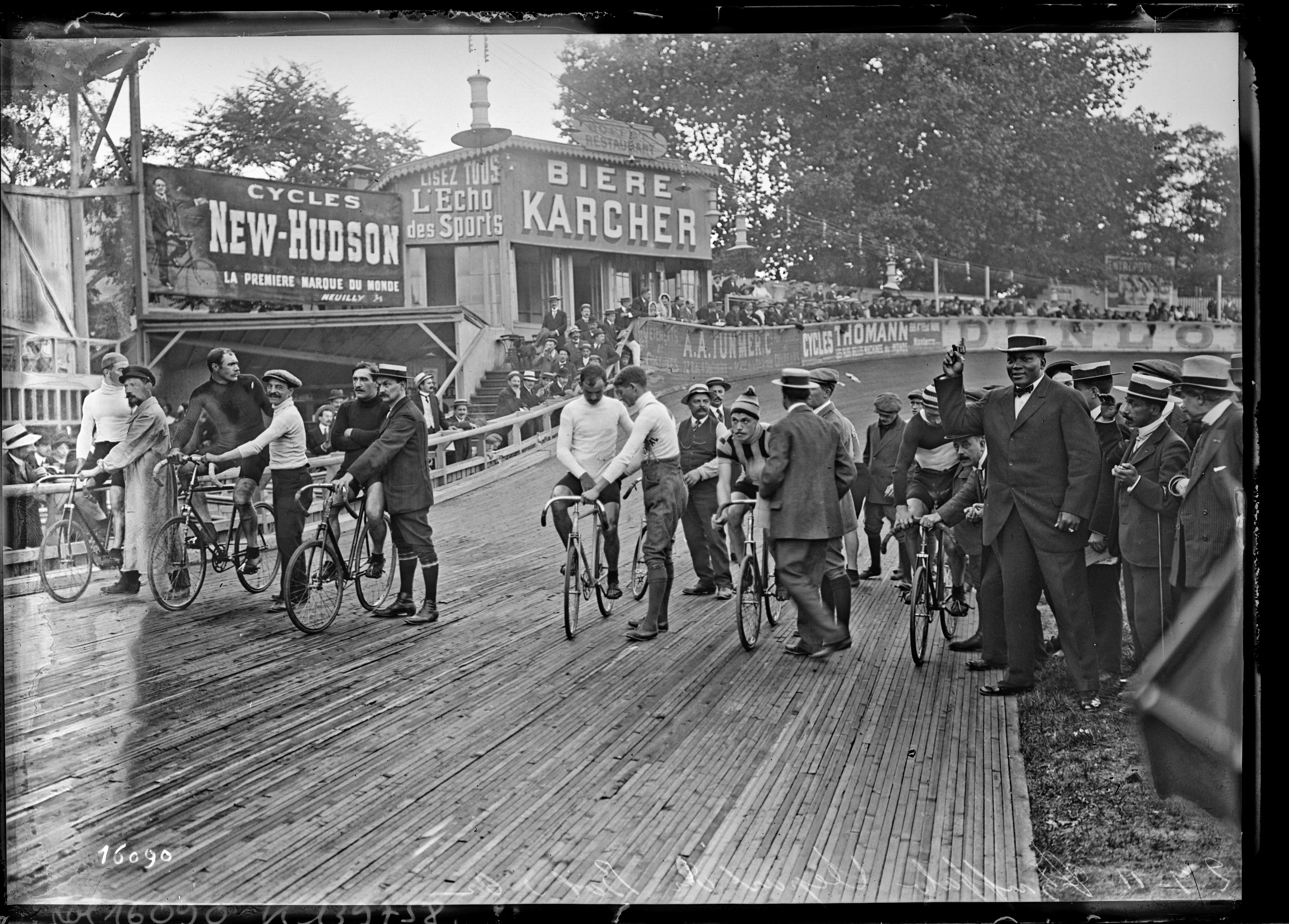
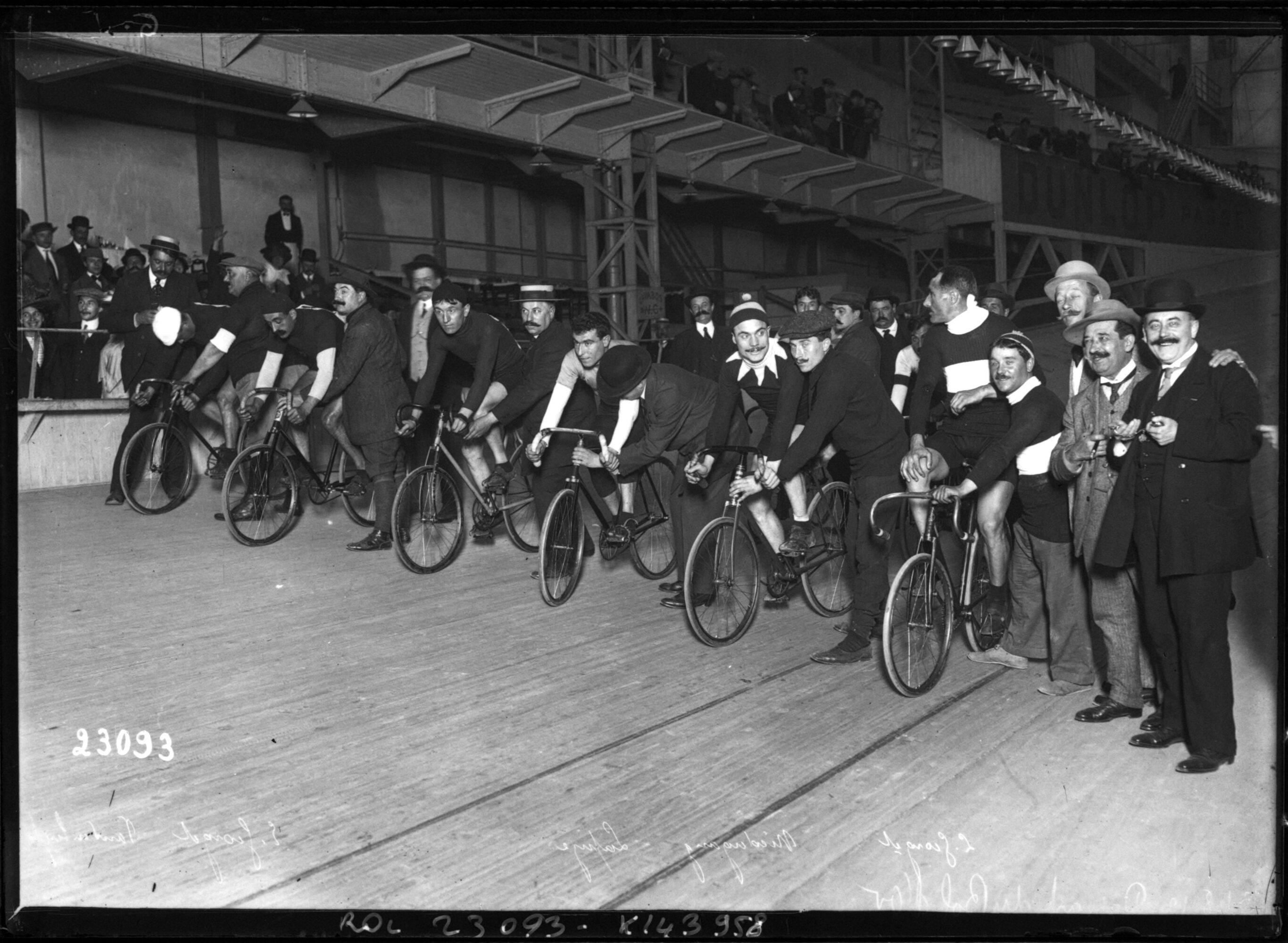
Niedergang at the start of Bol d'Or in 1911 (top) and 1912 (bottom)

Niedergang was born in Roubaix to parents of Alsatian origin. Before becoming a professional cyclist, he worked as a coachman. He began competing as an amateur in 1902. He completed his military service in 1904 and was still employed as a coachman when he married in 1907.

Niedergang initially established himself as a track cyclist, racing at velodromes across northern France. He turned professional in 1905, competing as an independent rider until joining the Automoto–Persan team in 1911, where he remained through 1914. During this period, he rode alongside leading French cyclists including Maurice Léturgie, François Faber, Georges Passerieu, Lucien Petit-Breton, and Louis Trousselier. His best-known results included eighth place at the 1911 Paris–Roubaix and second place in the 1911 Bol d'Or, a prestigious endurance track race held in Paris. He also competed in the Tour de France in 1911, 1912 and 1913. He had a top-10 finish in a stage, finishing sixth in the first stage of 1913. He failed to finish any of the three editions. The excessive effort and frequent falls led him to withdraw from the major event.

Niedergang's cycling career came to an end with the outbreak of the World War I. Mobilised into the French Army, he served throughout the conflict and reached the rank of adjudant. He was awarded the Croix de Guerre and received three citations for his military service. After the war, he became a bicycle dealer, operating a Marchand Cycles shop on Rue de l'Alma in Roubaix. He died in Roubaix on 19 March 1973, aged 88.

== General classification results timeline ==
Grand Tour general classification results
Grand Tour	1910	1911	1912	1913
Tour de France	—	DNF (DNF stage 2)	DNF (DNF stage 6)	DNF (DNF stage 3)
Major road one-day race results
Race	1910	1911	1912	1913
Paris–Roubaix	—	8	40	23
Paris–Tours	10	—	—	10
Paris–Menin	10	—	4	7
Major track one-day race results
Race	1910	1911	1912	1913
Bol d'Or	—	2	4	—
