= Giovanni Micheletto =

Italian cyclist

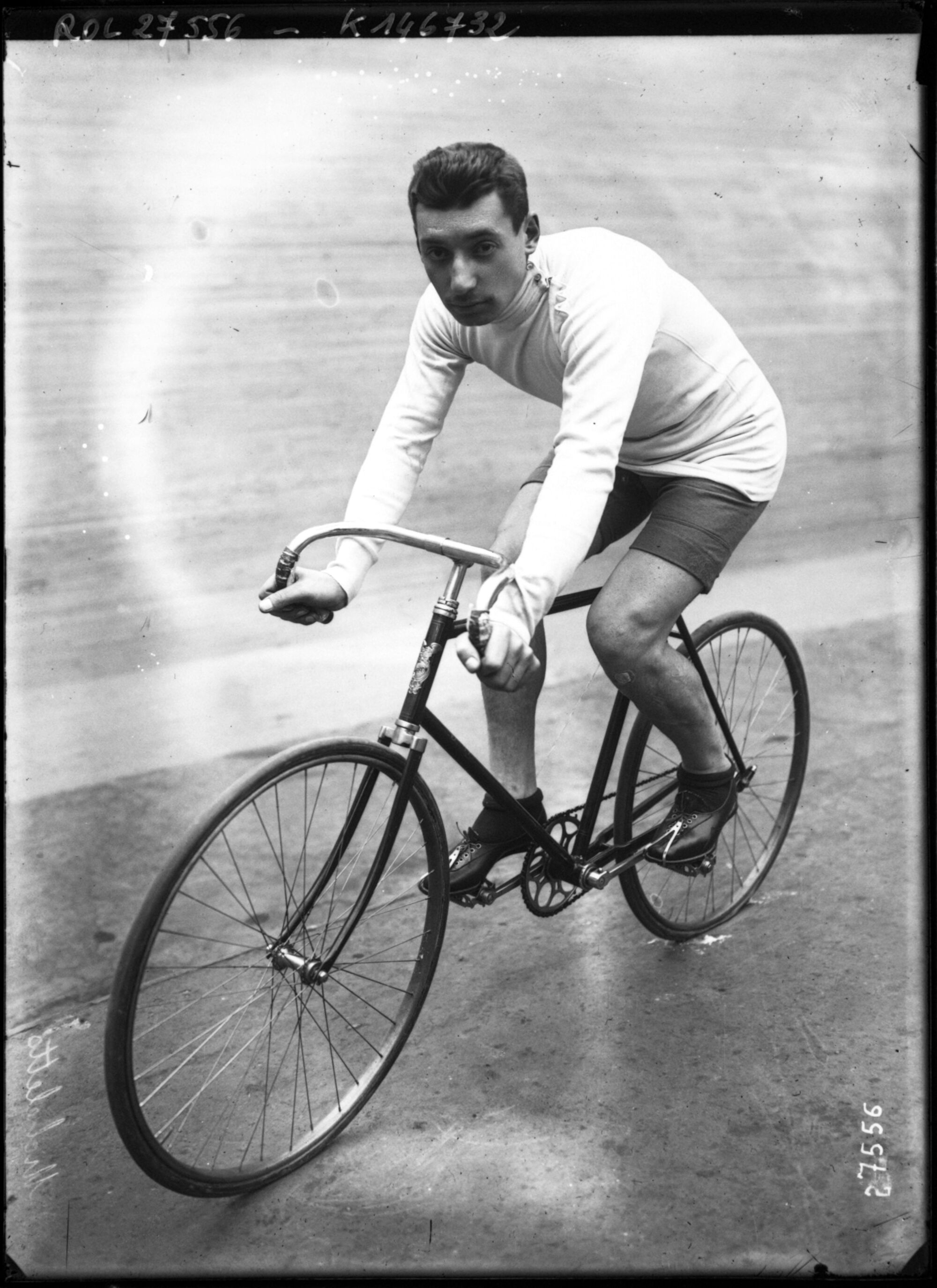

Personal information
- Full name: Giovanni Micheletto
- Nicknames: The Sacile Count; Nanè
- Born: 22 January 1889 Sacile, Kingdom of Italy
- Died: 29 September 1958 (aged 69) Sacile, Italy

Cycling career
- Sport: Cycling
- Discipline: Road
- Role: Rider

Major wins
- Grand Tours Tour de France 1 individual stage (1913) Giro d'Italia General classification (1912) 2 individual stages (1912) One-day races and Classics Giro di Lombardia (1910) Giro della Romagna (1911) Paris–Menen (1913)

Giovanni Micheletto (21 January 1889 – 29 September 1958) was an Italian professional road racing cyclist, nicknamed by fans "The Sacile Count" (from his native town in the province of Pordenone) and "Nanè". The highlight of his career was his overall win in the 1912 Giro d'Italia. He was also the first Italian cyclist to win a race in France, Paris-Menin in 1913.

== Palmarès ==
1910
Giro di Lombardia
Giro di Romagna-Toscana
1912
Giro d'Italia:

Winner overall classification (with Team Atala)
Winner stages 1 and 8

1913
Paris-Menin
Tour de France:

Winner stage 1
Wearing yellow jersey for one day

Sporting positions
Preceded by Carlo Galetti	Winner of the Giro d'Italia with Team Atala: Carlo Galetti, and Eberardo Pavesi; 1912	Succeeded by Carlo Oriani
