= Leopoldo Torricelli =

Italian cyclist

Personal information
- Born: 2 February 1893 Turin, Italy
- Died: 18 November 1930 (aged 37) Turin, Italy

Cycling career
- Sport: Cycling
- Role: Rider

Leopoldo Torricelli (2 February 1893 – 18 November 1930) was an Italian racing cyclist. He won the 1916 edition of the Giro di Lombardia.
