= Alfons Van Hecke =

Belgian cyclist

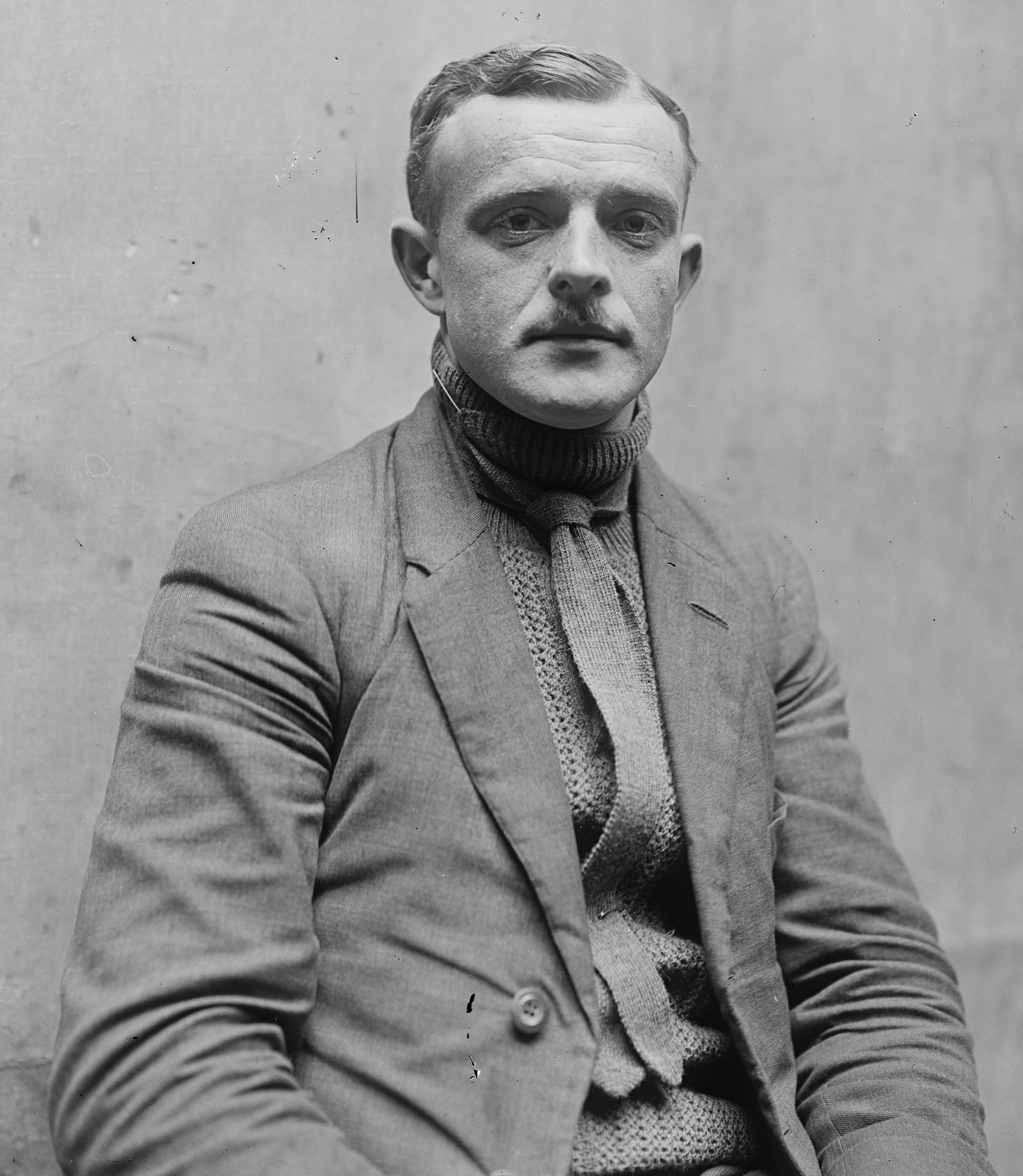
- Alfons Van Hecke in 1920

Personal information
- Born: 22 April 1891
- Died: 1 October 1959 (aged 68)

Cycling career
- Sport: Cycling
- Role: Rider

Alfons Van Hecke (22 April 1891 – 1 October 1959) was a Belgian racing cyclist. He rode in the 1920 Tour de France.
