= Henri Vanlerberghe =

Belgian cyclist

- Henri Vanlerberghe was a Belgian cyclist

Personal information
- Nickname: Den Doodrijder van Lichtervelde
- Born: 29 January 1891 Lichtervelde, Belgium
- Died: 10 April 1966 (aged 75) Lichtervelde, Belgium

Cycling career
- Sport: Cycling
- Discipline: Road
- Role: Rider

Major wins
- Grand Tours Tour de France 1 stage (1919) One-day races and Classics Tour of Flanders (1914)

Henri Vanlerberghe (sometimes Van Lerberghe) (Lichtervelde, 29 January 1891 – Lichtervelde, 10 April 1966) was a Belgian professional road bicycle racer. In 1919, he won the third edition of the Tour of Flanders.

Vanlerberghe was nicknamed "The deathrider from Lichtervelde" (Dutch: Den Doodrijder Van Lichtervelde), because at the start of most races he would tell his opponents he would ride them to death. Van Lerberghe attacked early in the race, which made him popular amongst cycling fans, but this cost him a lot of energy, and he rarely was able to compete in the end of the race.

In the 1913 Tour de France, Vanlerberghe started in the isolated cyclists' category, which meant that he was not part of a team, but rode as an individual. In the fifth stage, the individual cyclists left fifteen minutes later than the cyclists in teams, but because the cyclists in teams were slow, Van Lerberghe was able to reach them, and beat them to win the stage.

During the 1919 Ronde Van Vlaanderen, Vanlerberghe attacked with 120 km to go against the wind, and it looked like one of his chanceless efforts. He saw a helper with a bag of food for Marcel Buysse, and after he convinced the helper that Buysse was already out of the race, Vanlerberghe took the food. Later, he had to stop because a train had stopped at a crossing. Vanlerberghe did not wait for the train to leave, but entered the train with his bicycle and left at the other side. He reached the finish with a margin of 14 minutes, the largest margin in the history of the Tour of Flanders.

== Major results ==
1910
3rd Kampioenschap van Vlaanderen
1912
1st Tielt–Antwerpen–Tielt
1913
1913 Tour de France:

Winner stage 5

1914
2nd Tour of Flanders
1919
1st Tour of Flanders
3rd overall Circuit des Champs de Bataille
1920
2nd Kampioenschap van Vlaanderen
