= Charles Dumont (cyclist) =

Swiss cyclist (1888–1951)

Charles Dumont (11 November 1888 - 14 July 1951) was a Swiss cyclist who participated in the Tour de France in each year from 1910 through 1914.

== Biography ==
Dumont was born in La Brévine on 11 November 1888. He emerged as a talented rider in the Swiss amateur scene, winning the national amateur road race championship in 1910. That same year, he joined the professional team Panneton–Leman from July onwards. In 1911, he rode for Panneton–Dunlop.

He competed between 1910 and 1914 in five editions of the Tour de France. His best result was in 1913 finishing 23rd overall. He also competed in main international cycling races in his era; among others in Munchen–Zurich where he placed 14th in 1914. Late in his career he still achieved a third place in the Trophée des Grimpeurs in 1927.
