= Camillo Bertarelli =

Italian cyclist

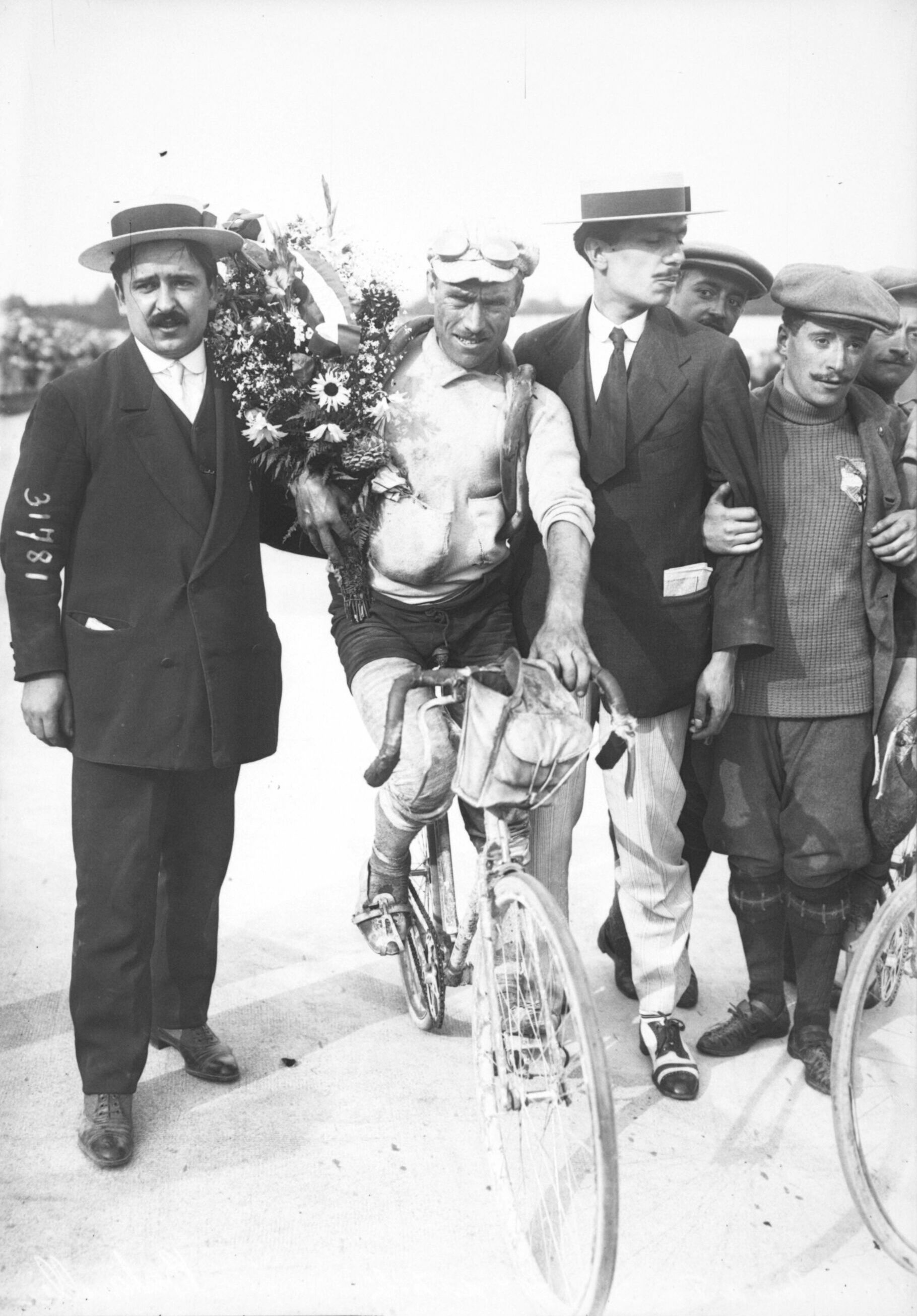

Personal information
- Born: 10 March 1886 Capaccio, Italy
- Died: 27 November 1982 (aged 96) Milan, Italy

Cycling career
- Sport: Cycling
- Discipline: Road
- Role: Rider

Professional teams
- 1912: Bianchi
- 1912: Soriani
- 1913-1914: Ganna-Dunlop
- 1914: Alleluia-Continental
- 1915-1916: Ganna
- 1919: Grigio Bleu

Camillo Bertarelli (10 March 1886 in Capaccio – 27 November 1982 in Milan) was an Italian racing cyclist.

== Major results ==
1911
2nd Piccolo Giro di Lombardia
1913
7th Milan–San Remo
8th Tour de France
14th Giro d'Italia
1916
2nd Giro di Lombardia
1920
3rd Tre Valli Varesine
