= Mariakerke, East Flanders =

Sub-municipality of the city of Ghent, Belgium

Mariakerke
- Sub-municipality of Ghent
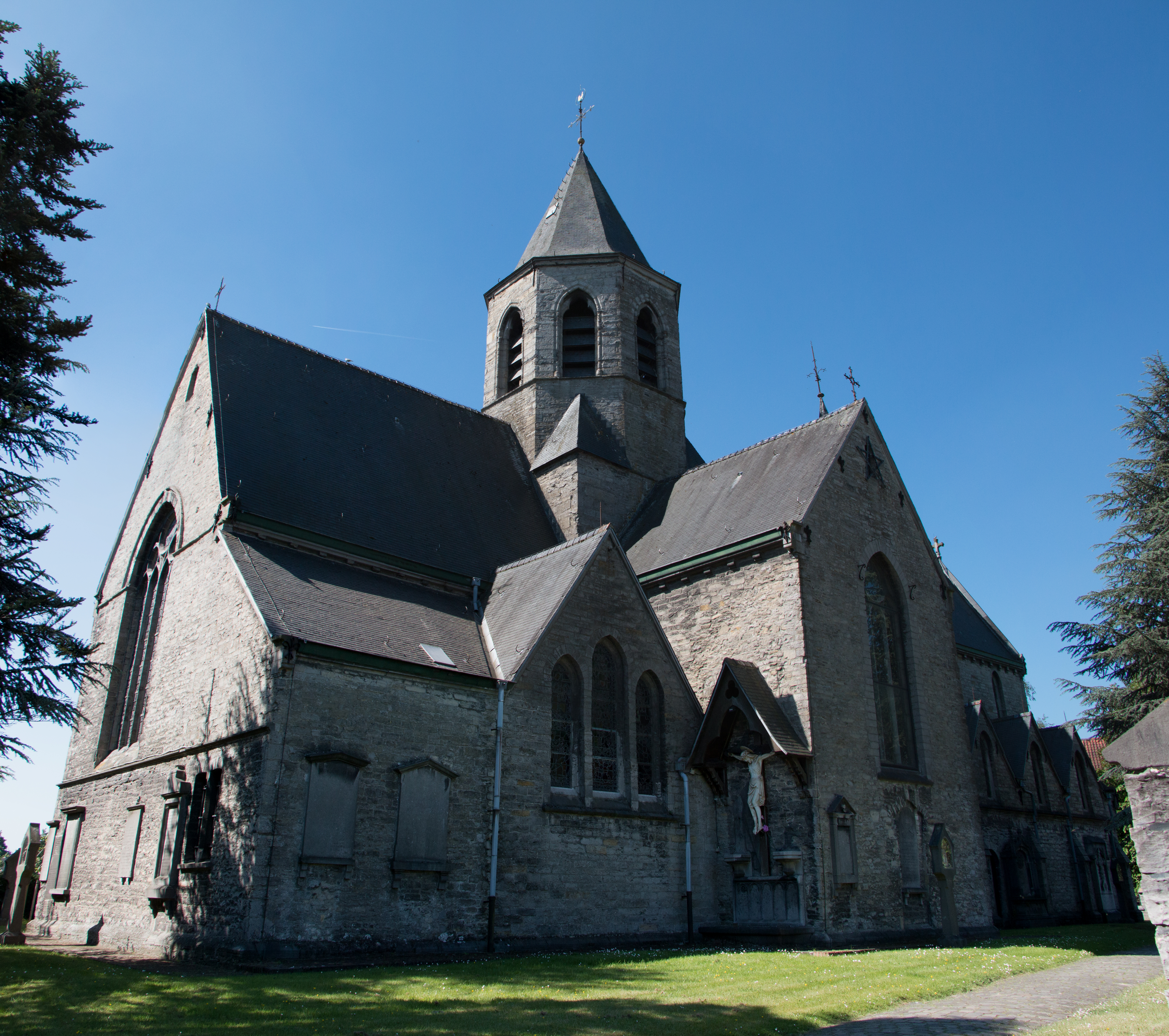
- Onze-Lieve-Vrouw Geboortekerk
- Interactive map of Mariakerke
- Location within Belgium Location within East Flanders
- Coordinates: 51°4′22″N 3°40′34″E
- Country: Belgium
- Community: Flemish Community
- Region: Flemish Region
- Province: East Flanders
- Arrondissement: Ghent
- Municipality: Ghent

Area
  - Total: 5.20 km^{2} (2.01 sq mi)

Population (2020-01-01)
  - Total: 17,241
  - Density: 3,320/km^{2} (8,590/sq mi)
- Postal codes: 9030
- Area codes: 09

Mariakerke (Dutch pronunciation: [maːˈrijaːˌkɛrkə]) is a sub-municipality of the city of Ghent located in the province of East Flanders, Flemish Region, Belgium. It was a separate municipality until 1977. On 1 January 1977, it was merged into Ghent.

== History ==
In the 17th century, Mariakerke was divided in two because of the construction of the "Brugse Vaart", a canal that connects the cities of Ghent and Bruges. The west side is Mariakerke center. The east side of Mariakerke is known as Kolegem. Because of the hundreds of years of separation, both halves developed their own unique atmosphere.

Mariakerke obtained the status of independent village in 1793, after which a bridge was constructed to connect both halves of the village. The bridge has been destroyed several times during war, which makes that the actual bridge was put up in 1964.

Besides the bridge, Mariakerke only had one main road which connected the village with the city of Ghent. This road was very important for the village, and still exists today under the name "Brugse Steenweg".

Later in the 18th century, a trade route was constructed from Ghent to Eeklo, and Mariakerke became a stop along this important road. Nowadays the road is better known as the N9, one of Ghent's most busy avenues. This new street had a significant impact on the 18th century Mariakerke.

The people from Mariakerke became more involved in the city life of Ghent once the industrial era had begun. A lot of villagers found a job at the many factories of Ghent, and a lot of rich industrials constructed castles and mansions in the rural Mariakerke. These castles can still be visited today, and add a special atmosphere to the village.

Mariakerke finally lost its rural character after World War II. A lot of city people moved to the country side, and Mariakerke witnessed a real population boom. In the 1970s, the city of Ghent started expanding again, slowly but surely absorbing the village of Mariakerke into its urban borders. 1976 saw the fusion of Mariakerke with Ghent, and ever since it has been part of the urban area of Ghent.

== Castles ==
- Castle Claeys-Bouüaert
- Castle de Hemptinne
- Castle ter Beken
- Castle Kervyn d'oudt Mooregem
- Castle van Tieghem de ten Berghe
- White castle or Henri Story
- Castle les Cygnes

== Kolegem ==
Kolegem is the eastern part of Mariakerke. Kolegem is separated from the rest of Mariakerke by a canal named Brugse Vaart, a canal between Ghent and Bruges. Some famous buildings in Kolegem are the former municipality house of Mariakerke (now containing only the administrative services), the Kollekasteel and the restaurant De Groene Staak.
