= 1913 Tour de France =

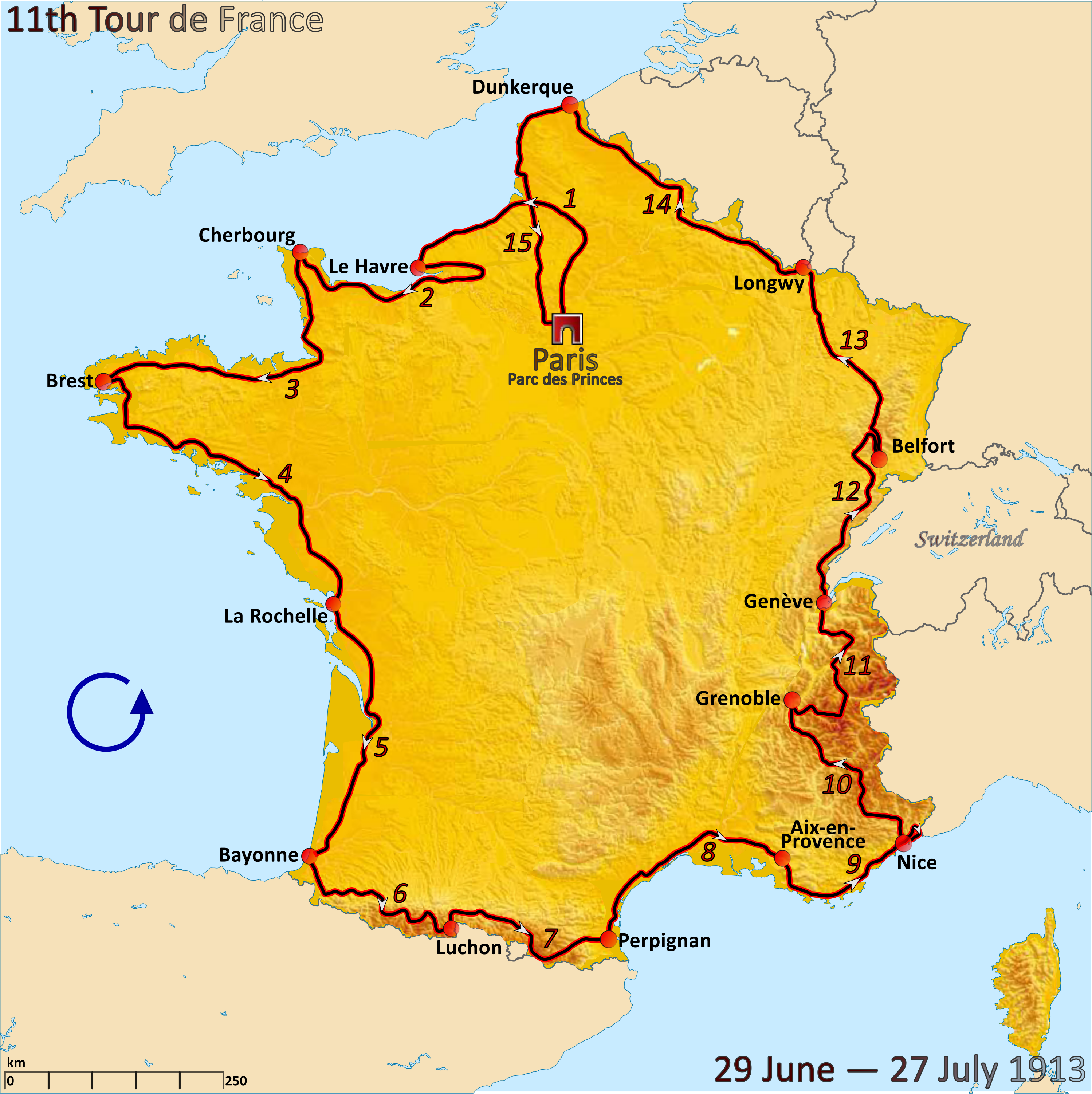
- Route of the 1913 Tour de France followed counterclockwise, starting in Paris

Race details
- Dates: 29 June – 27 July 1913
- Stages: 15
- Distance: 5,287 km (3,285 mi)
- Winning time: 197h 54' 00"

Results
	Winner	Philippe Thys (BEL)	(Peugeot)
	Second	Gustave Garrigou (FRA)	(Peugeot)
	Third	Marcel Buysse (BEL)	(Peugeot)

The 1913 Tour de France was the 11th edition of the Tour de France, taking place between 29 June and 27 July. The total distance was 5,287 kilometres (3,285 mi) and the average speed of the riders was 26.715 kilometres per hour (16.600 mph). The competition was won by the Belgian Philippe Thys, after in the crucial sixth stage Eugène Christophe broke his bicycle and lost several hours because he had to do the repairs by himself. In the last stage, Thys also had mechanical problems, but he got help during the repairs, and only got a penalty of ten minutes.

Between 1904 and 1912, the overall classification had been calculated by points, but in 1913 the classification was reverted to the original format from 1903, where the overall classification was calculated by adding up the times of the individual stages. The general classification has been calculated in the time format ever since.

== Innovations and changes ==
In 1905, the format of the Tour de France had been changed from the time system to the points system, to reduce the cheating that had caused the first four cyclists of the 1904 Tour de France to be disqualified. In the 1912 Tour de France, this system had been working against Eugène Christophe's chances, who would have been leading the time classification up until the final stage where he allowed a group to ride away. The system had been working against a French cyclist and in favor of a Belgian cyclist (Odiel Defraye, who won the Tour de France in 1912), and the French organisation changed the system back again to the time system: the finishing times of all stages were added per cyclist, and the cyclist with the least total time was the winner. This was also intended to increase combativity, because in the points system riders did not care about time gaps, so escaped low-ranked riders were ignored by high-ranked cyclists.

For the first time, the route of the race was in the opposite direction. Prior to the 1913 race, the Tour the France always had been in the clockwise direction through France, and in 1913 it was anticlockwise.

== Teams ==
The 1913 Tour started with 140 cyclists; there were 51 cyclists distributed over 9 teams, including all favourites for the overall victory. The remaining 89 cyclists started in the isolés category.

Although cyclists had started in teams previously, the rules had forbidden them to work together against other cyclists. In 1913, this changed, and cyclists from the same team were allowed to work together. The organisers preferred riders to ride solo, so they added a rule that if a cyclist would win a stage with a margin of 20 minutes or more, he would not only get his own prize money, but also the half of all the other cyclists' prize money of that stage.

The first African cyclist took part in the Tour de France in 1913: Ali Neffati from Tunisia. Neffati had been discovered by Tour organiser Henri Desgrange, and would later become a driver at l'Auto, the newspaper that organised the Tour de France.

== Race overview ==
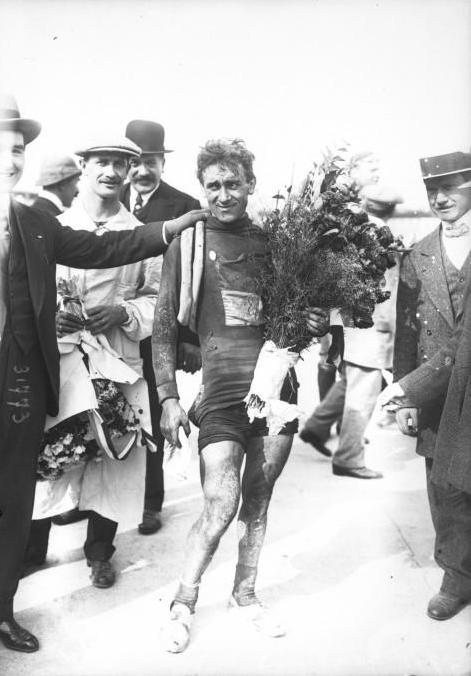
Philippe Thys, winner of the 1913 Tour de France, after finishing the race

This edition started with six former Tour de France winners (Louis Trousselier, Lucien Petit-Breton, François Faber, Octave Lapize, Gustave Garrigou and Odile Defraye), the most ever.

In the first stages, not much happened in the overall classification, as most cyclists were saving their energy for the Pyrenees. The stage was won by Italian Giovanni Micheletto in a sprint. Micheletto was not part of the first group in the second stage, and thus lost his lead. There were four cyclists who had been in the lead group in both stages, and they were jointly leading the Tour.

The most important event occurred in the third stage, when former winner Lapize stopped the race; either because he considered his earning insufficient, or because he thought his team was not good enough.

The crucial stage proved to be the sixth. At the start of the sixth stage, last year's winner Defraye led the general classification, some 5 minutes ahead of Eugène Christophe. In that sixth stage, the first mountains were climbed. Defraye was dropped quickly, and Christophe led the race. Christophe came up first on the Aubisque, and in second place behind Philippe Thys on the Tourmalet. On the way down from the Tourmalet, Christophe was hit by a race vehicle, and his fork broke, rendering his bike unusable, and the rules said that he had to repair it himself. He walked more than 10 km down to the next village, and found a place where he could repair his bicycle. He worked on it for over three hours, being watched by race officials who made sure that he was not helped by anyone. When Christophe asked a small boy, of seven years old, to work the bellows, he was fined with ten minutes. During this repair, angry with the draconian rules, he snapped: (at the hungry race commissaires) "If you're hungry, eat charcoal! [...] I am your prisoner and you will remain my wardens till the end". After his bicycle was fixed, he rode away and finished the stage, 3 hours and 50 minutes later than the stage winner Thys. Christophe's chances to win the 1913 Tour de France were over.

After that sixth stage, Marcel Buysse was in the lead. In the ninth stage, Buysse had mechanical failure with a broken handlebar, and finished almost three and a half hours after stage winner Lambot. This was the end of the chances for Buysse for the victory. Buysse did not give up, and won four of the remaining five stages.

The lead had transferred to Thys now. In the last stages, the race focussed on the duel between Petit-Breton and Thys. In the 14th stage, Petit-Breton fell down and stopped the race. In the same stage, Thys also fell down and remained unconscious for a while. When he was conscious again, he was helped to repair his bicycle. All help was illegal in 1913, but the jury only gave him a 10-minute penalty. Thys finished the stage, and kept 8'37" in front of Gustave Garrigou in the general classification. In the final stage, Thys stayed with Garrigou, and so won the 1913 Tour de France.

== Results ==
=== Stage winners ===
Stage characteristics and winners
Stage	Date	Course	Distance	Type (Note: In 1913, there was no distinction in the rules between plain stages and mountain stages; the icons shown here indicate which stages included mountains.)	Winner	Race leader
1	29 June	Paris to Le Havre	388 km (241 mi)	Plain stage	Giovanni Micheletto (ITA)	Giovanni Micheletto (ITA)
2	1 July	Le Havre to Cherbourg-en-Cotentin	364 km (226 mi)	Plain stage	Jules Masselis (BEL)	Jules Masselis (BEL) (Note: After the second stage, Masselis, Lauwers, Buysse and Defraye joined the lead. There were no rules for equal times in 1913.); Alfons Lauwers (BEL); Marcel Buysse (BEL); Odile Defraye (BEL)
3	3 July	Cherbourg to Brest	405 km (252 mi)	Plain stage	Henri Pelissier (FRA)	Odile Defraye (BEL)
4	5 July	Brest to La Rochelle	470 km (290 mi)	Plain stage	Marcel Buysse (BEL)	Odile Defraye (BEL)
5	7 July	La Rochelle to Bayonne	379 km (235 mi)	Plain stage	Henri Van Lerberghe (BEL)	Odile Defraye (BEL)
6	9 July	Bayonne to Luchon	326 km (203 mi)	Stage with mountain(s)	Philippe Thys (BEL)	Philippe Thys (BEL)
7	11 July	Luchon to Perpignan	324 km (201 mi)	Stage with mountain(s)	Marcel Buysse (BEL)	Marcel Buysse (BEL)
8	13 July	Perpignan to Aix-en-Provence	325 km (202 mi)	Plain stage	Gustave Garrigou (FRA)	Marcel Buysse (BEL)
9	15 July	Aix-en-Provence to Nice	356 km (221 mi)	Stage with mountain(s)	Firmin Lambot (BEL)	Philippe Thys (BEL)
10	17 July	Nice to Grenoble	333 km (207 mi)	Stage with mountain(s)	Francois Faber (LUX)	Philippe Thys (BEL)
11	19 July	Grenoble to Geneva	325 km (202 mi)	Stage with mountain(s)	Marcel Buysse (BEL)	Philippe Thys (BEL)
12	21 July	Geneva to Belfort	335 km (208 mi)	Stage with mountain(s)	Marcel Buysse (BEL)	Philippe Thys (BEL)
13	23 July	Belfort to Longwy	325 km (202 mi)	Stage with mountain(s)	François Faber (LUX)	Philippe Thys (BEL)
14	25 July	Longwy to Dunkerque	393 km (244 mi)	Plain stage	Marcel Buysse (BEL)	Philippe Thys (BEL)
15	27 July	Dunkerque to Paris	340 km (210 mi)	Plain stage	Marcel Buysse (BEL)	Philippe Thys (BEL)
	Total		5,287 km (3,285 mi)			

=== General classification ===
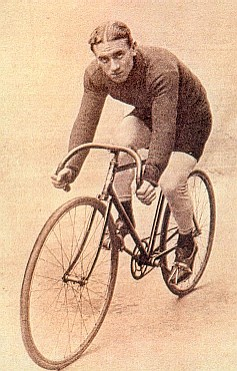
Philippe Thys, the winner of the 1913 Tour de France.

For each cyclist, the times they had needed in each stage was added up for the general classification. The cyclist with the least accumulated time after the last stage was the winner. Of the 140 starting cyclists, 25 finished.

Final general classification (1–10)
Rank	Rider	Team	Time
1	Philippe Thys (BEL)	Peugeot	197h 54' 00"
2	Gustave Garrigou (FRA)	Peugeot	+8' 37"
3	Marcel Buysse (BEL)	Peugeot	+ 3h 30' 55"
4	Firmin Lambot (BEL)	Griffon	+ 4h 12' 45"
5	François Faber (LUX)	Peugeot	+ 6h 26' 04"
6	Alfons Spiessens (BEL)	J.B. Louvet	+ 7h 57' 52"
7	Eugène Christophe (FRA)	Peugeot	+ 14h 06' 35"
8	Camillo Bertarelli (ITA)	—	+ 16h 21' 38"
9	Joseph Vandaele (BEL)	J.B. Louvet	+ 16h 39' 53"
10	Emile Engel (FRA)	Peugeot	+ 16h 52' 34"

Final general classification (11–25)
Rank	Rider	Sponsor	Time
11	Louis Trousselier (FRA)	J.B. Louvet	+ 18h 11' 13"
12	Jules Deloffre (FRA)	—	+ 18h 31' 31"
13	Clemente Canepari (ITA)	J.B. Louvet	+ 19h 11' 13"
14	Paul Deman (BEL)	Automoto	+ 19h 27' 02"
15	Vincent Dhulst (FRA)	—	+ 20h 10' 12"
16	Louis Petitjean (BEL)	—	+ 22h 00' 27"
17	Paul Hostein (FRA)	Peugeot	+ 25h 41' 06"
18	Maurice Leliaert (BEL)	—	+ 26h 18' 25"
19	Jean Alavoine (FRA)	Peugeot	+ 27h 43' 47"
20	Giuseppe Contesini (ITA)	—	+ 30h 37' 34"
21	Louis Coolsaet (BEL)	—	+ 31h 46' 50"
22	Achille De Smet (BEL)	—	+ 54h 44' 07"
23	Charles Dumont (SUI)	—	+ 64h 33' 55"
24	Celidonio Morini (ITA)	—	+ 76h 31' 47"
25	Henri Alavoine (FRA)	—	+ 76h 55' 52"

In the points system that had been used in previous years in the Tour de France, Garrigou would have won the race with 45 points, followed by Buysse with 48 points; Thys would have been third with 57 points.

=== Other classifications ===
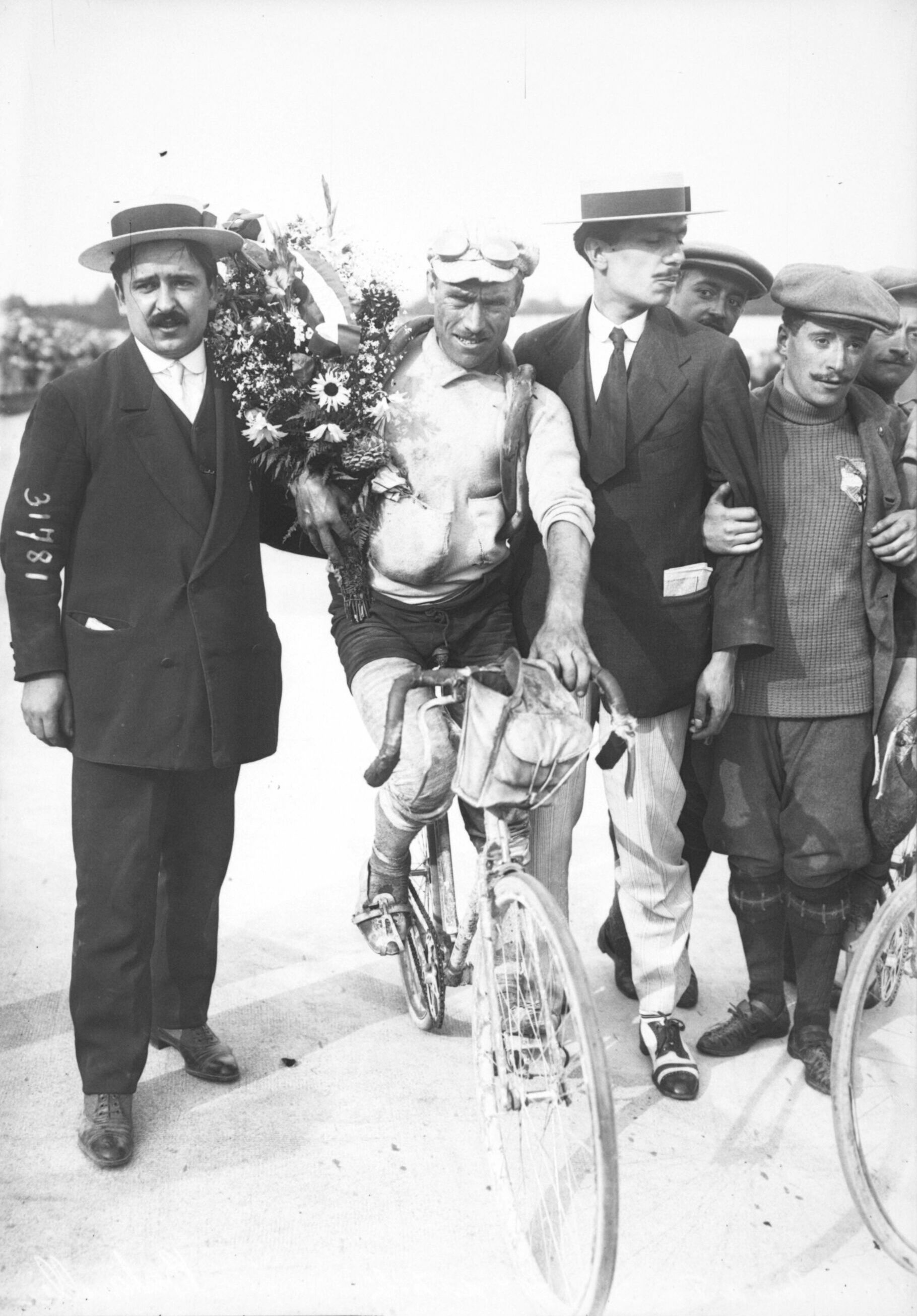
Camillo Bertarelli, the winner of the "isolés" category, for cyclists not part of a team

Camillo Bertarelli, ranked 8 in the general classification, became the winner of the "isolés" category. The "isolés" classification was calculated in the same way as the general classification, but only the isolated cyclists (not part of a team) were eligible.

The organising newspaper l'Auto named Philippe Thys the meilleur grimpeur. This unofficial title is the precursor to the mountains classification.

== Bibliography ==
- Amels, Wim (1984). De geschiedenis van de Tour de France 1903–1984 (in Dutch). Valkenswaard, Netherlands: Sport-Express. ISBN 978-90-70763-05-3.
- Augendre, Jacques (2016). "Guide historique" [Historical guide] (PDF). Tour de France (in French). Paris: Amaury Sport Organisation. Archived (PDF) from the original on 17 August 2016.
- Cleijne, Jan (2014). Legends of the Tour. London: Head of Zeus. ISBN 978-1-78185-998-8.
- Cossins, Peter; Best, Isabel; Sidwells, Chris; Griffith, Clare (2013). Le Tour 100: The Definitive History of the World's Greatest Race. London: Hachette UK. ISBN 978-1-84403-759-9.
- McGann, Bill; McGann, Carol (2006). The Story of the Tour de France: 1903–1964. Vol. 1. Indianapolis, IN: Dog Ear Publishing. ISBN 978-1-59858-180-5.
