= Pol Deman =

Belgian cyclist

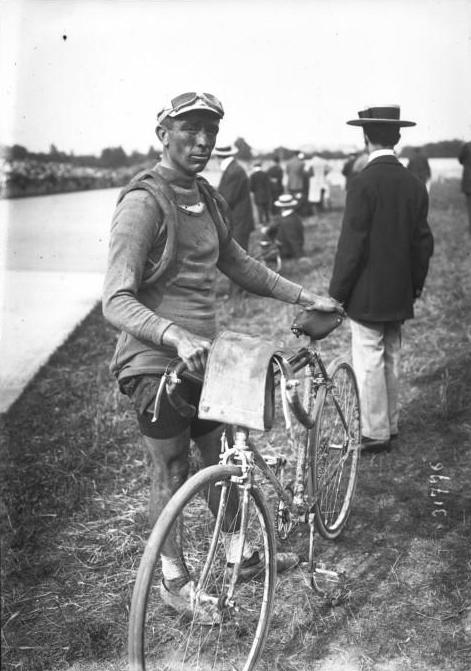
- Deman at the 1913 Tour de France

Personal information
- Full name: Polydore Joseph Deman
- Born: 25 April 1889 Rekkem, West Flanders, Belgium
- Died: 31 July 1961 (aged 72)

Cycling career
- Sport: Cycling
- Discipline: Road
- Role: Rider

Major wins
- Tour of Flanders (1913); Bordeaux–Paris (1914); Paris–Roubaix (1920); Paris–Tours (1923)

Polydore (Pol) Deman (25 April 1889 in Rekkem, West Flanders, Belgium – 31 July 1961 in Outrijve, Belgium) was a Belgian professional road bicycle racer for 15 years from 1909 to 1924, and a carpet maker by trade.

He won the first Tour of Flanders race in 1913 at the age of 25, defeating a field of 37 riders over a 330 km course that ended with 4 laps of the wooden track around a small pond at Mariakerke, the suburb of Ghent. He won the gruelling 592 km Bordeaux–Paris in 1914. His career almost ended with the first world war. He joined Belgium's espionage service and smuggled documents by bike into the neutral Netherlands. After many trips he was arrested by the Germans and jailed in Leuven ready to be shot. The Armistice saved him. Having survived the war, he started racing again and won Paris–Roubaix in 1920 and Paris–Tours in 1923.
