= Alfons Spiessens =

Belgian cyclist

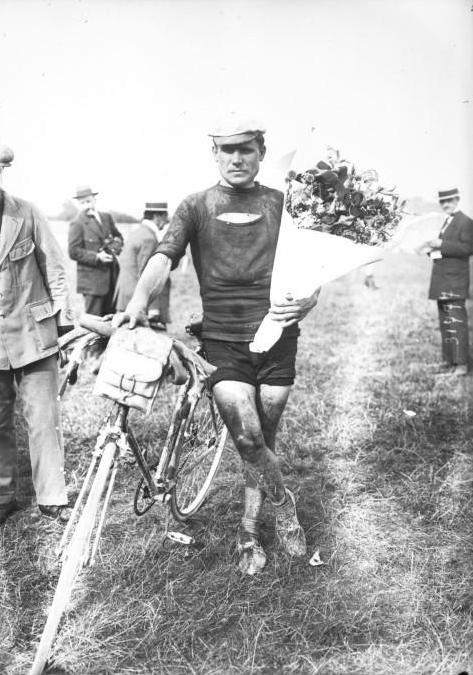

Personal information
- Born: 28 December 1888 Boom, Belgium
- Died: 21 April 1956 (aged 67) Uccle, Belgium

Cycling career
- Sport: Cycling
- Disciplines: Road, track
- Role: Rider

Professional teams
- 1911: Alcyon-Dunlop
- 1912-1913: JB Louvet
- 1913: Legnano
- 1914: JB Louvet

Alfons Spiessens often written as Fons Spiessens (28 December 1888 – 21 April 1956) was a Belgian cyclist.

== Major results ==
1909
3rd Belgian National Road Race Championships
1912
10th Tour de France
1913
6th Tour de France
1914
7th Tour de France
1919
1st Drie Zustersteden
1920
1st Six Days of Brussels (with Marcel Buysse)
