= Émile Engel =

French cyclist

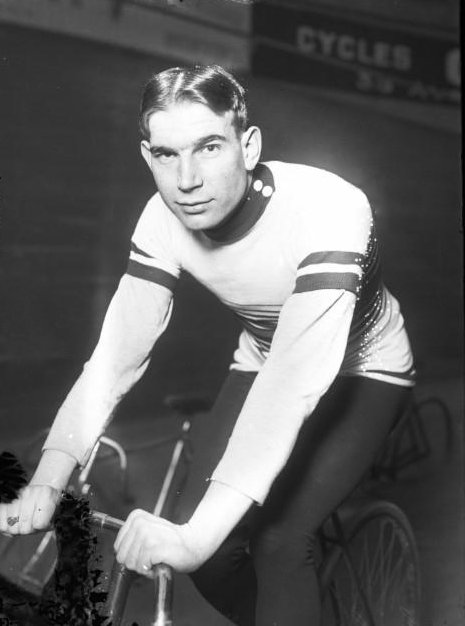
- Engel in 1913

Personal information
- Full name: Émile Engel
- Born: 5 April 1889 Colombes, France
- Died: 14 September 1914 (aged 25) Maurupt-le-Montois, France

Cycling career
- Sport: Cycling
- Discipline: Road
- Role: Rider

Major wins
- One stage 1914 Tour de France

Émile Engel (5 April 1889 – 14 September 1914) was a French professional road bicycle racer. In the 1914 Tour de France he won stage 3, and was disqualified after stage 8 when he was involved in a fight with a race official. Only three months later he was killed in World War I.

== Major results ==
1910
Tour de France des Indépendants:

Winner stage 10

1911
Tour de France des Indépendants:

Winner stage 12

1914
Tour de France:

Winner stage 3
