= Marcel Buysse =

Belgian cyclist

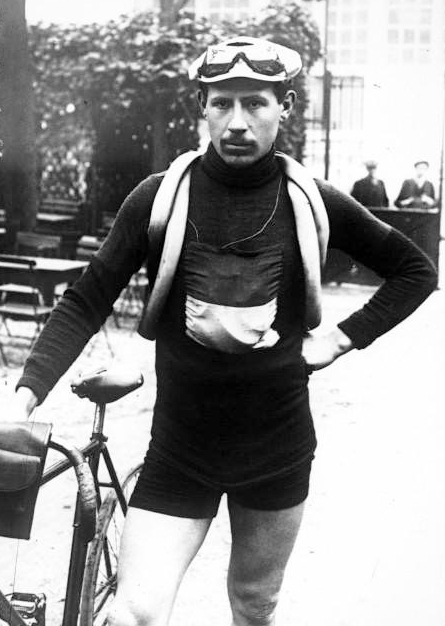
- Buysse at the 1913 Tour de France

Personal information
- Full name: Marcel Buysse
- Born: 11 November 1889 Wontergem, Belgium
- Died: 3 October 1939 (aged 49) Ghent, Belgium

Cycling career
- Sport: Cycling
- Discipline: Road/Track
- Role: Rider

Major wins
- Grand Tours Tour de France 6 individual stages (1913) One-day races and Classics Tour of Flanders (1914)

Marcel Buysse (Wontergem, 11 November 1889- Ghent, 3 October 1939) was a Belgian racing cyclist.

After finishing fourth in the 1912 Tour de France, Buysse led the general classification for two days until a broken handlebar cost him dearly. Despite winning six stages in the 1913 Tour de France, he could only finish in 3rd place, 3 hours, 30 minutes and 55 seconds behind Philippe Thys.

He finished third in the 1919 Giro d'Italia.

Marcel was the brother of Jules Buysse and Tour de France-winner Lucien Buysse, and the father of cyclists Norbert Buysse and Albert Buysse.

== Major results ==
1910
Moorslede
1912
Tour de France:

4th place overall classification

1913
Tour de France:

3rd place overall classification
Winner stages 4, 7, 11, 12, 14 and 15

Stage 3 Ronde van België
1914
Stage 1 Ronde van België
Tour of Flanders
1919
Giro d'Italia:

3rd place overall classification

1920
Six Days of Brussels (with Alfons Spiessens)
1921
Paris — Dinant
Arlon — Oostende
1922
Six Days of Ghent (with Oscar Egg)
