= Laigny =

- Commune
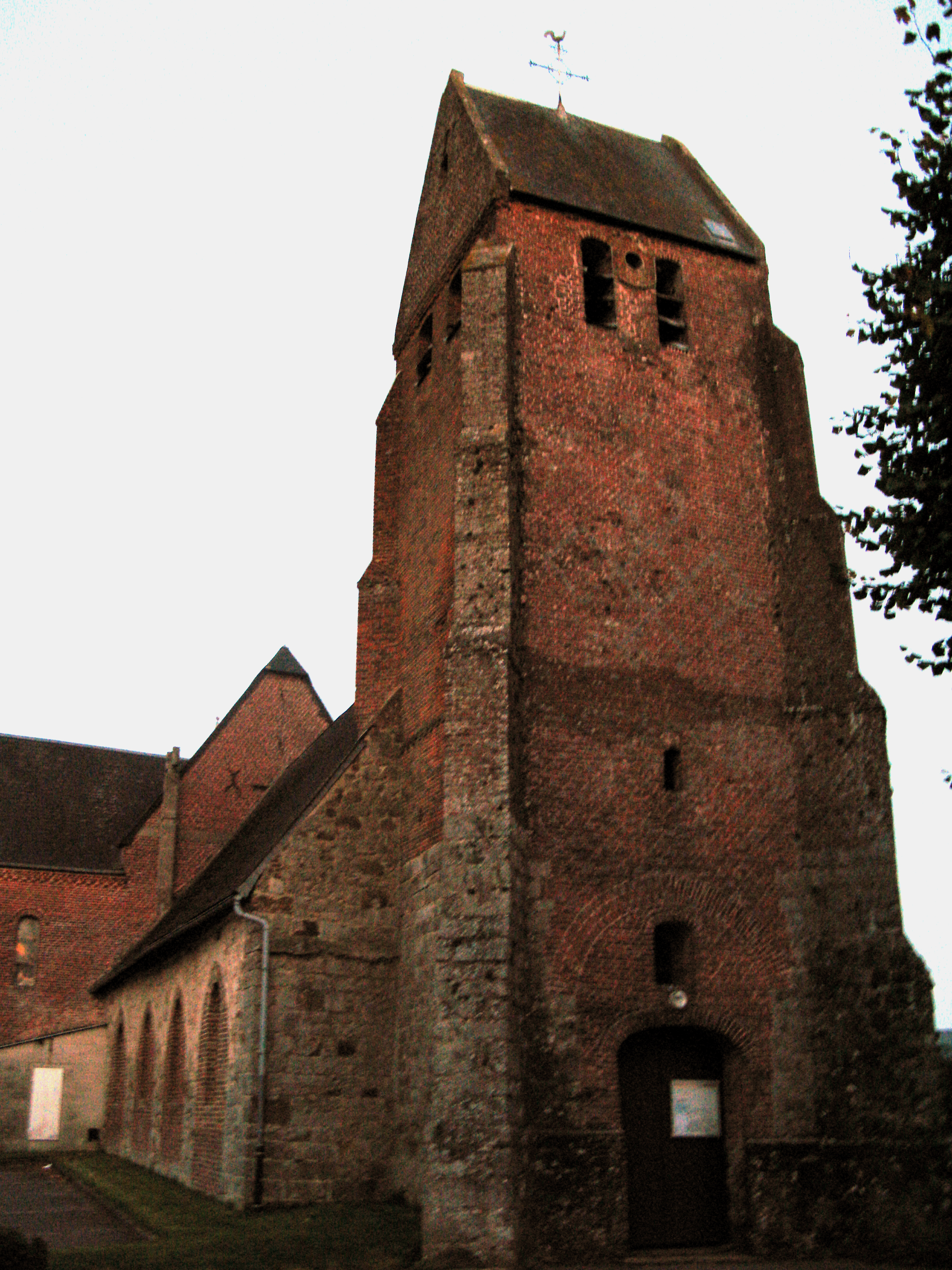
- The church of Laigny
- Location of Laigny
- Location within France Location within Hauts-de-France
- Coordinates: 49°51′32″N 3°51′14″E
- Country: France
- Region: Hauts-de-France
- Department: Aisne
- Arrondissement: Vervins
- Canton: Vervins
- Intercommunality: Thiérache du Centre

Government
  - Mayor (2026–32): Yves Moularde
- Area^{1}: 10.83 km^{2} (4.18 sq mi)
- Elevation: 100 m (330 ft)
- Highest elevation: 204 m (669 ft)
- Lowest elevation: 140 m (460 ft)
- Population (2023): 189
  - Density: 17.5/km^{2} (45.2/sq mi)
- Time zone: UTC+01:00 (CET)
  - Summer (DST): UTC+02:00 (CEST)
- INSEE/Postal code: 02401 /02140
- ^{1} French Land Register data, which excludes lakes, ponds, glaciers > 1 km^{2} (0.386 sq mi or 247 acres) and river estuaries.

Laigny (French pronunciation: [lɛɲi]) is a commune in the Aisne department in Hauts-de-France in northern France.

== Population ==
Historical population
Year	Pop.	±% p.a.
1968	287	—
1975	247	−2.12%
1982	249	+0.12%
1990	258	+0.44%
1999	221	−1.71%
2007	231	+0.55%
2012	214	−1.52%
2017	196	−1.74%
2023	189	−0.60%
Source: INSEE

== See also ==
- Communes of the Aisne department
