= 1921 Tour de France, Stage 9 to Stage 15 =

Cycling race stages

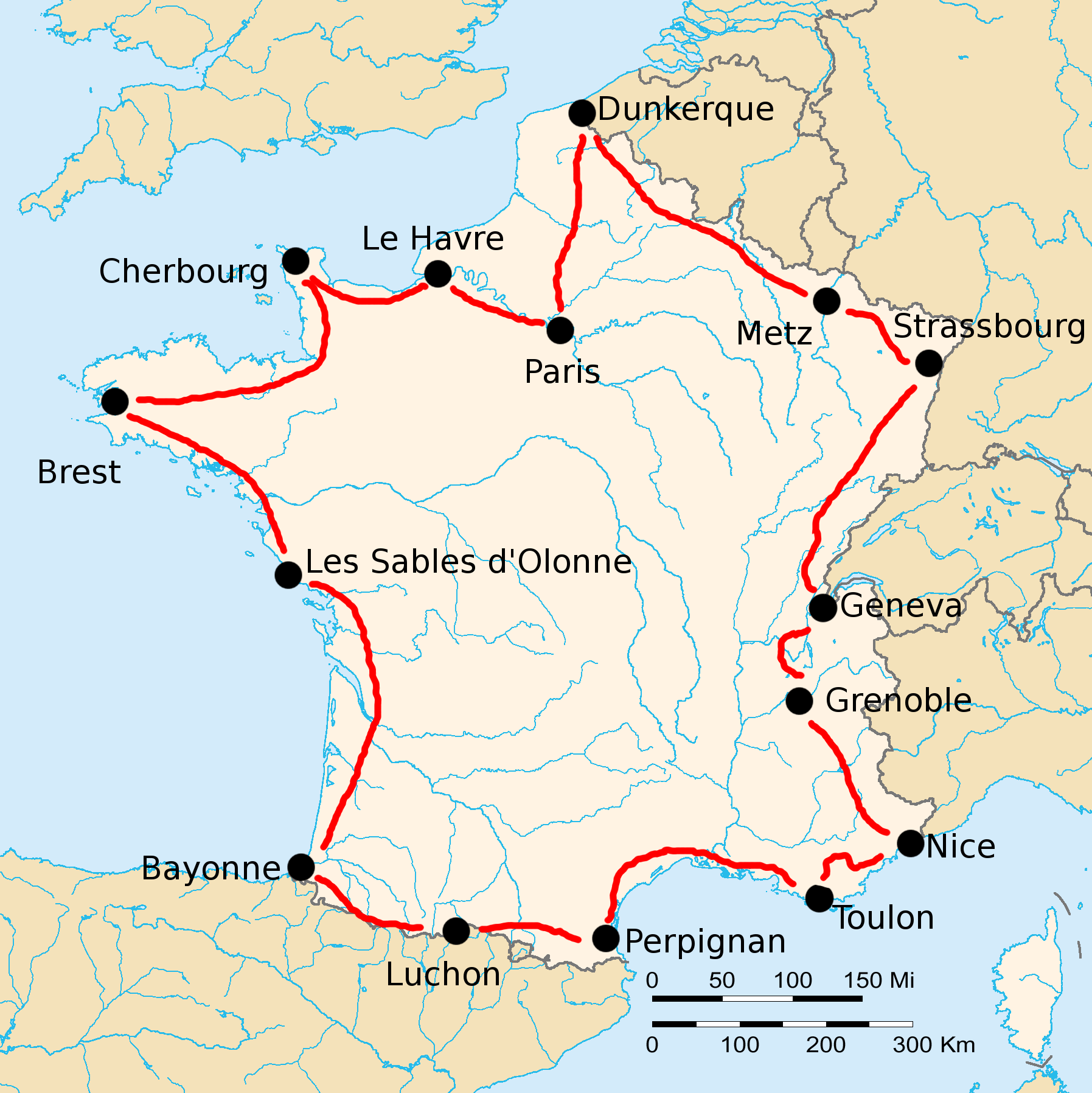
Route of the 1921 Tour de France

The 1921 Tour de France was the 15th edition of Tour de France, one of cycling's Grand Tours. The Tour began in Paris with a flat stage on 26 June, and Stage 9 occurred on 12 July with a mountainous stage from Toulon. The race finished in Paris on 24 July.

== Stage 9 ==
12 July 1921 — Toulon to Nice, 272 km (169 mi)

Stage 9 result

Rank	Rider	Time
1	Firmin Lambot (BEL)	11h 26' 09"
2	Victor Leenaerts (BEL)	+ 31"
3	Léon Scieur (BEL)	+ 3' 15"
4	Luigi Lucotti (ITA)	+ 4' 22"
5	Honoré Barthélémy (FRA)	+ 13' 13"
6	Hector Heusghem (BEL)	+ 13' 47"
7	Jean Belvaux (BEL)	+ 16' 16"
8	Noël Amenc (FRA)	+ 19' 15"
9	Hector Tiberghien (BEL)	s.t.
10	Henri Ferrara (FRA)	s.t.

General classification after stage 9

Rank	Rider	Time
1	Léon Scieur (BEL)	
2	Hector Heusghem (BEL)	+ 15' 38"
3	Honoré Barthélémy (FRA)	+ 1h 39' 53"
4		
5		
6		
7		
8		
9		
10		

== Stage 10 ==
14 July 1921 — Nice to Grenoble, 333 km (207 mi)

Stage 10 result

Rank	Rider	Time
1	Léon Scieur (BEL)	14h 02' 30"
2	Luigi Lucotti (ITA)	+ 6' 08"
3	Hector Heusghem (BEL)	+ 6' 09"
4	Honoré Barthélémy (FRA)	+ 18' 42"
5	Eugène Dhers (FRA)	s.t.
6	Hector Tiberghien (BEL)	+ 21' 01"
7	Léon Despontin (BEL)	+ 27' 28"
8	Louis Mottiat (BEL)	+ 35' 08"
9	Camille Leroy (BEL)	+ 39' 34"
10	Joseph Muller (FRA)	+ 45' 22"

General classification after stage 10

Rank	Rider	Time
1	Léon Scieur (BEL)	
2	Hector Heusghem (BEL)	+ 21' 47"
3	Honoré Barthélémy (FRA)	+ 1h 58' 35"
4		
5		
6		
7		
8		
9		
10		

== Stage 11 ==
16 July 1921 — Grenoble to Geneva, 325 km (202 mi)

Stage 11 result

Rank	Rider	Time
1	Félix Goethals (FRA)	14h 04' 13"
2	Honoré Barthélémy (FRA)	s.t.
3	Luigi Lucotti (ITA)	s.t.
4	Hector Heusghem (BEL)	s.t.
5	Victor Leenaerts (BEL)	s.t.
6	Léon Scieur (BEL)	s.t.
7	Henri Collé (SUI)	s.t.
8	Camille Leroy (BEL)	+ 7' 42"
9	Félix Sellier (BEL)	+ 16' 44"
10	Léon Despontin (BEL)	s.t.

General classification after stage 11

Rank	Rider	Time
1	Léon Scieur (BEL)	
2	Hector Heusghem (BEL)	+ 21' 47"
3	Honoré Barthélémy (FRA)	+ 1h 58' 35"
4		
5		
6		
7		
8		
9		
10		

== Stage 12 ==
18 July 1921 — Geneva to Strasbourg, 371 km (231 mi)

Stage 12 result

Rank	Rider	Time
1	Honoré Barthélémy (FRA)	15h 07' 53"
2	Hector Heusghem (BEL)	s.t.
3	Léon Scieur (BEL)	s.t.
4	Jean Belvaux (BEL)	+ 27' 33"
5	Luigi Lucotti (ITA)	s.t.
6	Louis Mottiat (BEL)	s.t.
7	Félix Sellier (BEL)	s.t.
8	Eugène Dhers (FRA)	s.t.
9	Hector Tiberghien (BEL)	s.t.
10	Léon Despontin (BEL)	s.t.

General classification after stage 12

Rank	Rider	Time
1	Léon Scieur (BEL)	
2	Hector Heusghem (BEL)	+ 21' 47"
3	Honoré Barthélémy (FRA)	+ 1h 58' 35"
4		
5		
6		
7		
8		
9		
10		

== Stage 13 ==
20 July 1921 — Strasbourg to Metz, 300 km (190 mi)

Stage 13 result

Rank	Rider	Time
1	Félix Sellier (BEL)	10h 08' 30"
2	Victor Leenaerts (BEL)	s.t.
3	Joseph Muller (FRA)	s.t.
4	Paul Coppens (FRA)	+ 33' 22"
5	Félix Goethals (FRA)	+ 46' 18"
6	Luigi Lucotti (ITA)	s.t.
7	Honoré Barthélémy (FRA)	s.t.
8	Louis Mottiat (BEL)	s.t.
9	Hector Tiberghien (BEL)	s.t.
10	Hector Heusghem (BEL)	s.t.

General classification after stage 13

Rank	Rider	Time
1	Léon Scieur (BEL)	
2	Hector Heusghem (BEL)	+ 21' 47"
3	Honoré Barthélémy (FRA)	+ 1h 58' 35"
4		
5		
6		
7		
8		
9		
10		

== Stage 14 ==
22 July 1921 — Metz to Dunkerque, 433 km (269 mi)

Stage 14 result

Rank	Rider	Time
1	Félix Goethals (FRA)	17h 40' 40"
2	Luigi Lucotti (ITA)	s.t.
3	Félix Sellier (BEL)	s.t.
4	Hector Tiberghien (BEL)	s.t.
5	Léon Despontin (BEL)	s.t.
6	Louis Mottiat (BEL)	s.t.
7	Hector Heusghem (BEL)	s.t.
8	Léon Scieur (BEL)	s.t.
9	Eugène Dhers (FRA)	+ 3' 13"
10	Honoré Barthélémy (FRA)	+ 5' 36"

General classification after stage 14

Rank	Rider	Time
1	Léon Scieur (BEL)	
2	Hector Heusghem (BEL)	+ 21' 47"
3	Honoré Barthélémy (FRA)	+ 2h 04' 11"
4		
5		
6		
7		
8		
9		
10		

== Stage 15 ==
24 July 1921 — Dunkerque to Paris, 340 km (210 mi)

Stage 15 result

Rank	Rider	Time
1	Félix Goethals (FRA)	15h 25' 09"
2	Luigi Lucotti (ITA)	s.t.
3	Hector Tiberghien (BEL)	s.t.
4	Hector Heusghem (BEL)	s.t.
5	Louis Mottiat (BEL)	s.t.
6	Victor Leenaerts (BEL)	s.t.
7	Léon Despontin (BEL)	s.t.
8	Joseph Muller (FRA)	s.t.
9	Henri Ferrara (FRA)	s.t.
10	Camille Leroy (BEL)	s.t.

General classification after stage 15

Rank	Rider	Time
1	Léon Scieur (BEL)	221h 50' 26"
2	Hector Heusghem (BEL)	+ 18' 36"
3	Honoré Barthélémy (FRA)	+ 2h 01' 00"
4	Luigi Lucotti (ITA)	+ 2h 39' 18"
5	Hector Tiberghien (BEL)	+ 4h 33' 19"
6	Victor Leenaerts (BEL)	+ 4h 53' 23"
7	Léon Despontin (BEL)	+ 5h 01' 54"
8	Camille Leroy (BEL)	+ 7h 56' 27"
9	Firmin Lambot (BEL)	+ 8h 26' 25"
10	Félix Goethals (FRA)	+ 8h 42' 26"
