= 1920 Tour de France, Stage 1 to Stage 8 =

Cycling race stages

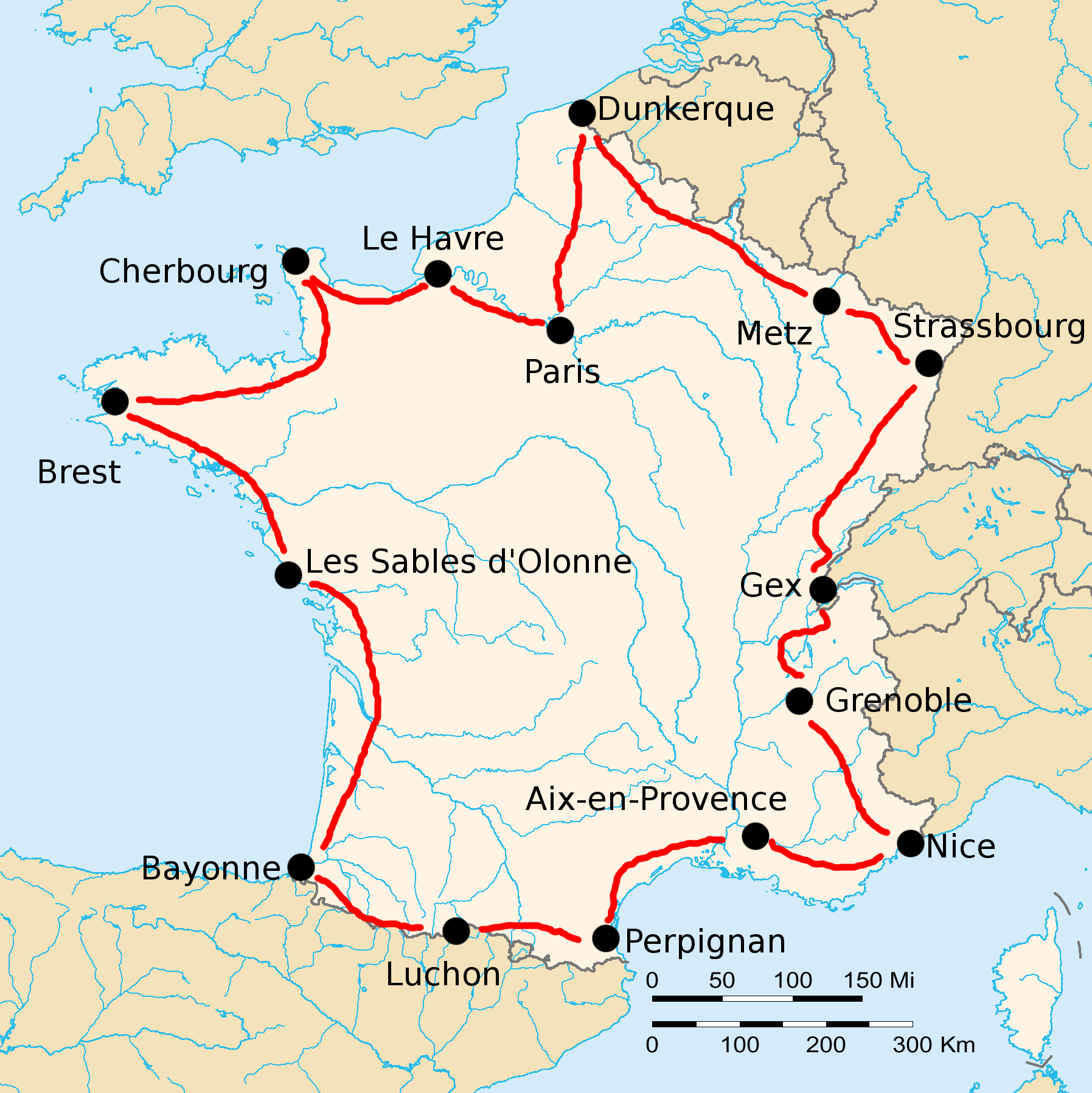
Route of the 1920 Tour de France

The 1920 Tour de France was the 14th edition of Tour de France, one of cycling's Grand Tours. The Tour began in Paris with a flat stage on 27 June, and Stage 8 occurred on 11 July with a flat stage to Aix-en-Provence. The race finished in Paris on 27 July.

== Stage 1 ==
27 June 1920 — Paris to Le Havre, 388 km (241 mi)

Stage 1 result and general classification after stage 1

Rank	Rider	Time
1	Louis Mottiat (BEL)	14h 50' 46"
2	Jean Rossius (BEL)	s.t.
3	Philippe Thys (BEL)	s.t.
4	Félix Goethals (FRA)	s.t.
5	Émile Masson (BEL)	s.t.
6	Francis Pélissier (FRA)	+ 2' 46"
7	Eugène Dhers (FRA)	+ 15' 33"
8	Henri Pélissier (FRA)	+ 16' 56"
9	Eugène Christophe (FRA)	s.t.
10	Léon Scieur (BEL)	s.t.

== Stage 2 ==
29 June 1920 — Le Havre to Cherbourg-en-Cotentin, 364 km (226 mi)

Stage 2 result

Rank	Rider	Time
1	Philippe Thys (BEL)	15h 17' 48"
2	Félix Goethals (FRA)	s.t.
3	René Chassot (FRA)	s.t.
4	Francis Pélissier (FRA)	s.t.
5	Hector Tiberghien (BEL)	s.t.
6	Jules Masselis (BEL)	s.t.
7	Louis Mottiat (BEL)	s.t.
8	Émile Masson (BEL)	s.t.
9	Félix Sellier (BEL)	s.t.
10	Théo Wynsdau (BEL)	s.t.

General classification after stage 2

Rank	Rider	Time
=1	Philippe Thys (BEL)	
=1	Jean Rossius (BEL)	
=1	Louis Mottiat (BEL)	
=1	Félix Goethals (FRA)	
=1	Émile Masson (BEL)	
6		
7		
8		
9		
10		

== Stage 3 ==
1 July 1920 — Cherbourg-en-Cotentin to Brest, 405 km (252 mi)

Stage 3 result

Rank	Rider	Time
1	Henri Pélissier (FRA)	16h 09' 00"
2	Émile Masson (BEL)	s.t.
3	Eugène Christophe (FRA)	s.t.
4	Philippe Thys (BEL)	s.t.
5	Hector Heusghem (BEL)	s.t.
6	Honoré Barthélémy (FRA)	s.t.
7	Jean Rossius (BEL)	s.t.
8	Léon Scieur (BEL)	s.t.
9	Félix Goethals (FRA)	s.t.
10	Louis Heusghem (BEL)	s.t.

General classification after stage 3

Rank	Rider	Time
=1	Philippe Thys (BEL)	
=1	Jean Rossius (BEL)	
=1	Félix Goethals (FRA)	
=1	Émile Masson (BEL)	
5		
6		
7		
8		
9		
10		

== Stage 4 ==
3 July 1920 — Brest to Les Sables-d'Olonne, 412 km (256 mi)

Stage 4 result

Rank	Rider	Time
1	Henri Pélissier (FRA)	15h 59' 28"
2	Philippe Thys (BEL)	s.t.
3	Romain Bellenger (FRA)	s.t.
4	Louis Mottiat (BEL)	s.t.
5	Hector Heusghem (BEL)	s.t.
6	Eugène Christophe (FRA)	s.t.
7	Émile Masson (BEL)	s.t.
8	Robert Jacquinot (FRA)	+ 13' 56"
9	Louis Heusghem (BEL)	s.t.
10	Hector Tiberghien (BEL)	s.t.

General classification after stage 4

Rank	Rider	Time
=1	Philippe Thys (BEL)	
=1	Émile Masson (BEL)	
3	Eugène Christophe (FRA)	+ 16' 56"
4		
5		
6		
7		
8		
9		
10		

== Stage 5 ==
5 July 1920 — Les Sables-d'Olonne to Bayonne, 482 km (300 mi)

Stage 5 result

Rank	Rider	Time
1	Firmin Lambot (BEL)	19h 44' 00"
2	Philippe Thys (BEL)	s.t.
3	Jean Rossius (BEL)	s.t.
4	Joseph Van Daele (BEL)	s.t.
5	Félix Goethals (FRA)	s.t.
6	Hector Heusghem (BEL)	s.t.
7	Louis Mottiat (BEL)	s.t.
8	Honoré Barthélémy (FRA)	s.t.
9	Émile Masson (BEL)	s.t.
10	Léon Scieur (BEL)	s.t.

General classification after stage 5

Rank	Rider	Time
=1	Philippe Thys (BEL)	
=1	Émile Masson (BEL)	
3	Hector Heusghem (BEL)	+ 16' 56"
4		
5		
6		
7		
8		
9		
10		

== Stage 6 ==
7 July 1920 — Bayonne to Luchon, 326 km (203 mi)

Stage 6 result

Rank	Rider	Time
1	Firmin Lambot (BEL)	15h 15' 25"
2	Philippe Thys (BEL)	+ 2' 31"
3	Hector Heusghem (BEL)	+ 13' 49"
4	Louis Heusghem (BEL)	+ 28' 05"
5	Léon Scieur (BEL)	+ 41' 42"
6	Émile Masson (BEL)	+ 55' 05"
7	Louis Mottiat (BEL)	+ 1h 00' 46"
8	Félix Goethals (FRA)	+ 1h 04' 10"
9	Honoré Barthélémy (FRA)	+ 1h 09' 35"
10	Jean Rossius (BEL)	+ 1h 10' 00"

General classification after stage 6

Rank	Rider	Time
1	Philippe Thys (BEL)	
2	Hector Heusghem (BEL)	+ 28' 14"
3	Émile Masson (BEL)	+ 52' 34"
4		
5		
6		
7		
8		
9		
10		

== Stage 7 ==
9 July 1920 — Luchon to Perpignan, 323 km (201 mi)

Stage 7 result

Rank	Rider	Time
1	Jean Rossius (BEL)	13h 41' 50"
2	Philippe Thys (BEL)	s.t.
3	Léon Scieur (BEL)	s.t.
4	Firmin Lambot (BEL)	s.t.
5	Hector Heusghem (BEL)	s.t.
6	Honoré Barthélémy (FRA)	+ 15' 26"
7	Louis Heusghem (BEL)	+ 15' 29"
8	Émile Masson (BEL)	+ 36' 34"
9	Louis Mottiat (BEL)	+ 1h 00' 50"
10	Félix Goethals (FRA)	+ 1h 14' 50"

General classification after stage 7

Rank	Rider	Time
1	Philippe Thys (BEL)	
2	Hector Heusghem (BEL)	+ 28' 14"
3	Firmin Lambot (BEL)	+ 1h 20' 00"
4		
5		
6		
7		
8		
9		
10		

== Stage 8 ==
11 July 1920 — Perpignan to Aix-en-Provence, 325 km (202 mi)

Stage 8 result

Rank	Rider	Time
1	Louis Heusghem (BEL)	12h 12' 18"
2	Philippe Thys (BEL)	+ 8' 03"
3	Hector Heusghem (BEL)	s.t.
4	Léon Scieur (BEL)	s.t.
5	Émile Masson (BEL)	s.t.
6	Firmin Lambot (BEL)	s.t.
7	Louis Mottiat (BEL)	s.t.
8	Joseph Van Daele (BEL)	s.t.
9	Jean Rossius (BEL)	+ 13' 03"
10	Félix Goethals (FRA)	s.t.

General classification after stage 8

Rank	Rider	Time
1	Philippe Thys (BEL)	
2	Hector Heusghem (BEL)	+ 28' 14"
3	Firmin Lambot (BEL)	+ 1h 20' 00"
4		
5		
6		
7		
8		
9		
10		
