= 1920 Tour de France, Stage 9 to Stage 15 =

Cycling race stages

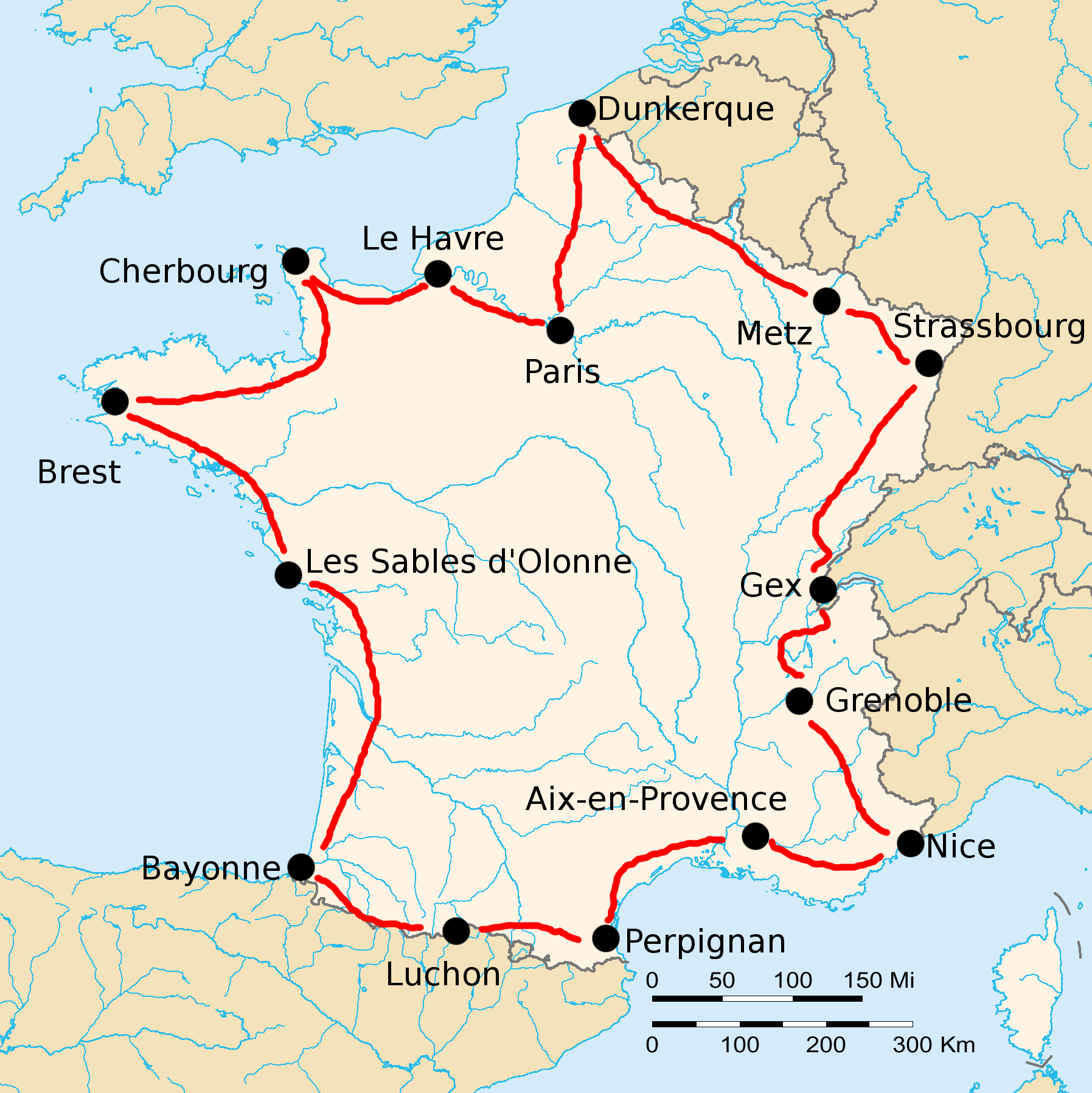
Route of the 1920 Tour de France

The 1920 Tour de France was the 14th edition of Tour de France, one of cycling's Grand Tours. The Tour began in Paris with a flat stage on 27 June, and Stage 9 occurred on 14 July with a mountainous stage from Aix-en-Provence. The race finished in Paris on 27 July.

== Stage 9 ==
14 July 1920 — Aix-en-Provence to Nice, 356 km (221 mi)

Stage 9 result

Rank	Rider	Time
1	Philippe Thys (BEL)	16h 15' 44"
2	Joseph Van Daele (BEL)	+ 5' 16"
3	Léon Scieur (BEL)	+ 11' 26"
4	Firmin Lambot (BEL)	+ 17' 04"
5	Hector Heusghem (BEL)	+ 31' 41"
6	Jean Rossius (BEL)	+ 32' 39"
7	Honoré Barthélémy (FRA)	+ 36' 46"
8	Henri Ferrara (FRA)	+ 52' 13"
9	José Pelletier (FRA)	s.t.
10	Félix Goethals (FRA)	+ 1h 03' 37"

General classification after stage 9

Rank	Rider	Time
1	Philippe Thys (BEL)	
2	Hector Heusghem (BEL)	+ 59' 55"
3	Firmin Lambot (BEL)	+ 1h 37' 04"
4		
5		
6		
7		
8		
9		
10		

== Stage 10 ==
16 July 1920 — Nice to Grenoble, 333 km (207 mi)

Stage 10 result

Rank	Rider	Time
1	Hector Heusghem (BEL)	14h 47' 39"
2	Jean Rossius (BEL)	s.t.
3	Philippe Thys (BEL)	s.t.
4	Firmin Lambot (BEL)	s.t.
5	Léon Scieur (BEL)	+ 2' 51"
6	Louis Heusghem (BEL)	+ 7' 36"
7	Émile Masson (BEL)	+ 20' 35"
8	Honoré Barthélémy (FRA)	+ 51' 10"
9	Eugène Dhers (FRA)	s.t.
10	Félix Goethals (FRA)	+ 56' 47"

General classification after stage 10

Rank	Rider	Time
1	Philippe Thys (BEL)	
2	Hector Heusghem (BEL)	+ 59' 55"
3	Firmin Lambot (BEL)	+ 1h 37' 04"
4		
5		
6		
7		
8		
9		
10		

== Stage 11 ==
18 July 1920 — Grenoble to Gex, Ain, 362 km (225 mi)

Stage 11 result

Rank	Rider	Time
1	Léon Scieur (BEL)	15h 30' 43"
2	Firmin Lambot (BEL)	s.t.
3	Hector Heusghem (BEL)	s.t.
4	Louis Heusghem (BEL)	s.t.
5	Philippe Thys (BEL)	+ 2' 34"
6	Honoré Barthélémy (FRA)	+ 31' 40"
7	Émile Masson (BEL)	s.t.
8	Joseph Muller (FRA)	+ 1h 17' 56"
9	Jean Rossius (BEL)	+ 1h 36' 49"
10	Eugène Dhers (FRA)	+ 1h 53' 55"

General classification after stage 11

Rank	Rider	Time
1	Philippe Thys (BEL)	
2	Hector Heusghem (BEL)	+ 57' 21"
3	Firmin Lambot (BEL)	+ 1h 34' 30"
4		
5		
6		
7		
8		
9		
10		

== Stage 12 ==
20 July 1920 — Gex to Strasbourg, 354 km (220 mi)

Stage 12 result

Rank	Rider	Time
1	Philippe Thys (BEL)	14h 19' 19"
2	Jean Rossius (BEL)	s.t.
3	Firmin Lambot (BEL)	s.t.
4	Hector Heusghem (BEL)	s.t.
5	Louis Heusghem (BEL)	s.t.
6	Émile Masson (BEL)	s.t.
7	Joseph Van Daele (BEL)	+ 6' 36"
8	Léon Scieur (BEL)	s.t.
9	Félix Goethals (FRA)	+ 16' 25"
10	Honoré Barthélémy (FRA)	s.t.

General classification after stage 12

Rank	Rider	Time
1	Philippe Thys (BEL)	
2	Hector Heusghem (BEL)	+ 57' 21"
3	Firmin Lambot (BEL)	+ 1h 34' 30"
4		
5		
6		
7		
8		
9		
10		

== Stage 13 ==
22 July 1920 — Strasbourg to Metz, 300 km (190 mi)

Stage 13 result

Rank	Rider	Time
1	Philippe Thys (BEL)	11h 13' 34"
2	Jean Rossius (BEL)	s.t.
3	Félix Goethals (FRA)	s.t.
4	Honoré Barthélémy (FRA)	s.t.
5	Louis Heusghem (BEL)	s.t.
6	Émile Masson (BEL)	s.t.
7	Léon Scieur (BEL)	s.t.
8	Hector Heusghem (BEL)	s.t.
9	Firmin Lambot (BEL)	s.t.
10	Noël Amenc (FRA)	s.t.

General classification after stage 13

Rank	Rider	Time
1	Philippe Thys (BEL)	
2	Hector Heusghem (BEL)	+ 57' 21"
3	Firmin Lambot (BEL)	+ 1h 34' 30"
4		
5		
6		
7		
8		
9		
10		

== Stage 14 ==
24 July 1920 — Metz to Dunkerque, 433 km (269 mi)

Stage 14 result

Rank	Rider	Time
1	Félix Goethals (FRA)	18h 33' 51"
2	Philippe Thys (BEL)	s.t.
3	Jean Rossius (BEL)	s.t.
4	Joseph Van Daele (BEL)	s.t.
5	Léon Scieur (BEL)	s.t.
6	Hector Heusghem (BEL)	s.t.
7	Honoré Barthélémy (FRA)	s.t.
8	Firmin Lambot (BEL)	s.t.
9	Louis Heusghem (BEL)	+ 14"
10	Émile Masson (BEL)	s.t.

General classification after stage 14

Rank	Rider	Time
1	Philippe Thys (BEL)	
2	Hector Heusghem (BEL)	+ 57' 21"
3	Firmin Lambot (BEL)	+ 1h 34' 30"
4		
5		
6		
7		
8		
9		
10		

== Stage 15 ==
27 July 1920 — Dunkerque to Paris, 340 km (210 mi)

Stage 15 result

Rank	Rider	Time
1	Jean Rossius (BEL)	14h 31' 40"
2	Philippe Thys (BEL)	s.t.
3	Hector Heusghem (BEL)	s.t.
4	Honoré Barthélémy (FRA)	s.t.
5	Émile Masson (BEL)	s.t.
6	Eugène Dhers (FRA)	s.t.
7	Léon Scieur (BEL)	s.t.
8	Louis Heusghem (BEL)	+ 5' 05"
9	Firmin Lambot (BEL)	s.t.
10	Joseph Muller (FRA)	+ 20' 32"

General classification after stage 15

Rank	Rider	Time
1	Philippe Thys (BEL)	228h 36' 13"
2	Hector Heusghem (BEL)	+ 57' 21"
3	Firmin Lambot (BEL)	+ 1h 39' 35"
4	Léon Scieur (BEL)	+ 1h 44' 58"
5	Émile Masson (BEL)	+ 2h 56' 52"
6	Louis Heusghem (BEL)	+ 3h 40' 47"
7	Jean Rossius (BEL)	+ 3h 49' 55"
8	Honoré Barthélémy (FRA)	+ 5h 35' 19"
9	Félix Goethals (FRA)	+ 9h 23' 07"
10	Joseph Van Daele (BEL)	+ 10h 45' 41"
