= List of highest points reached in the Tour de France =

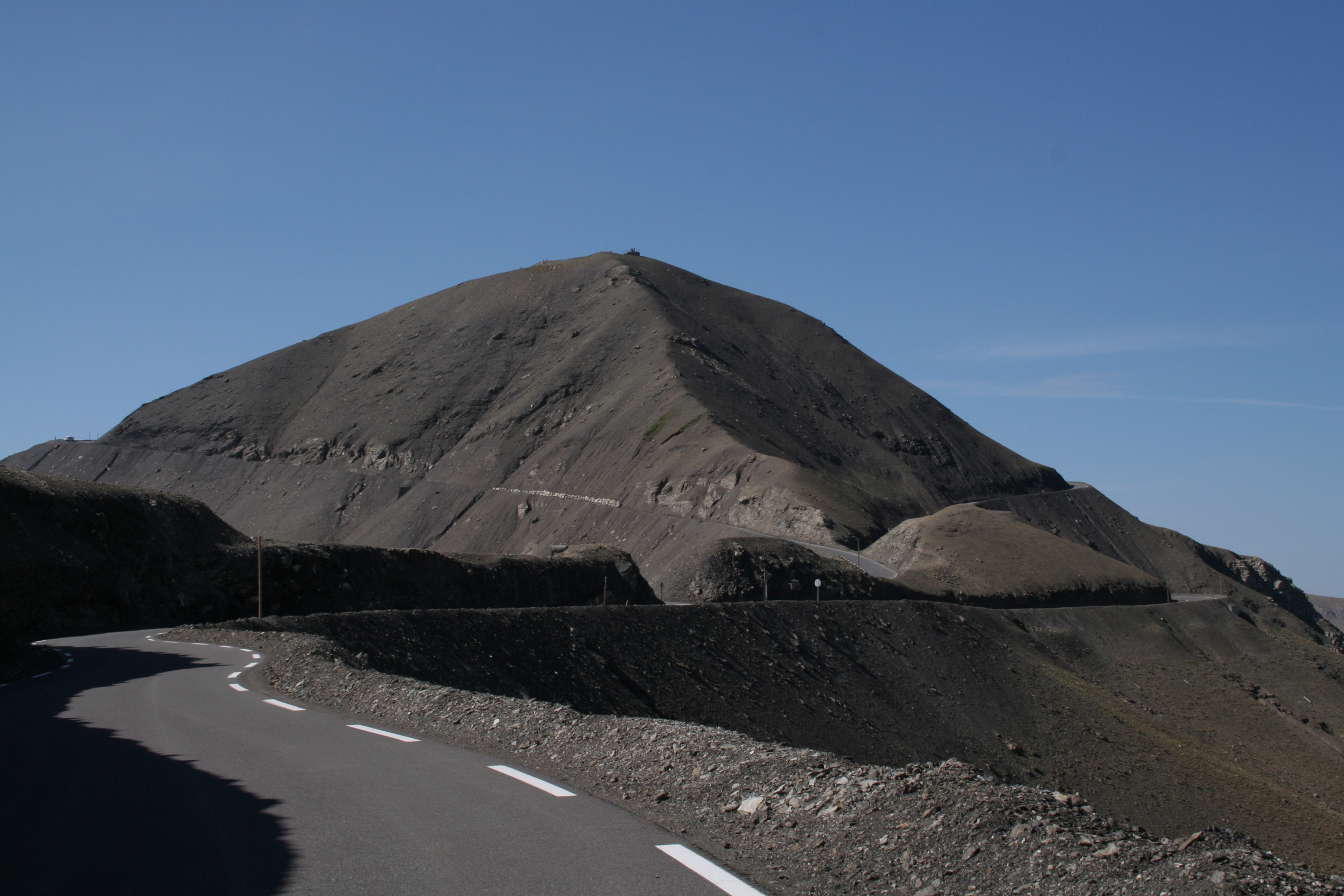
The highest point of elevation ever reached in the Tour de France is 2,860 m (9,383 ft) at the Cime de la Bonette loop road in the Alps (as of 2019), seen here from the northern ascent of the Col de la Bonette mountain pass.

The Tour de France is an annual men's multiple stage bicycle race primarily held in France, generally considered the most famous bicycle race in the world. It was founded by the French sports journalist and former professional road racing cyclist Henri Desgrange, who became the first director of the race. He was passionate about taking the Tour up to the highest reachable points of elevation in the Alps and Pyrenees using the most difficult routes.

The highest point of the first Tour de France in 1903 was the summit of the 1,161-metre-high (3,809 ft) Col de la République mountain pass in the Mont Pilat area of the Massif Central highland region. The following year the route remained identical, but in 1905 and 1906 the Tour moved into the Alps, in particular the Dauphiné Alps, and up to the Col Bayard at 1,264 m (4,147 ft). The 1907 Tour took the race higher, up to 1,326 m (4,350 ft) with the Col de Porte in the Chartreuse Mountains. This point was again the highest for the next two Tours.

The race first reached high altitude (Note: Altitudes beyond around 2,100 m (6,890 ft) above sea level (high altitude) affect the human body by limiting the amount of oxygen one is able to absorb, which is detrimental to a cyclist's performance.) on the ninth edition in 1910 when it passed the 2,115-metre-high (6,939 ft) Col du Tourmalet in the Pyrenees. Not satisfied with that height, Desgrange the following year introduced his favoured Col du Galibier in the Alps, which summited at 2,556 m (8,386 ft) via a single-laned 365-metre-long (1,198 ft) tunnel that first opened in 1891. At the time, Desgrange eulogised over the Galibier in comparison to the Tourmalet and other climbs, saying: "Oh Sappey, oh Laffrey, oh Bayard, oh Tourmalet! I will not shirk from my duty in proclaiming that compared to the Galibier you are no more than pale and vulgar babies; faced with this giant we can do no more than tip our hats and bow!" The Galibier was the highest point of elevation in each Tour to 1937, which led it to become one of the most iconic climbs in the race. The 1938 race went higher up to the Alpine Col de l'Iseran at 2,770 m (9,088 ft). Various Alpine passes, including the Galibier, were the highest points reached in Tours until the 1962 race saw a new high of 2,860 m (9,383 ft) at the Cime de la Bonette in the Alps, a short loop road which forks from the summit of the Col de la Bonette. As of 2019, this remains the highest point of elevation reached by the Tour de France. Since 1962, all the highest points of Tours bar one have remained above 2,000 m (6,562 ft), using passes in the high Alps and Pyrenees.

== List ==
Key
*	Point was also used as the location of the stage finish
~	Climb was used for the first time in Tour de France history
^	Point was a new highest elevation reached in all Tour editions up to then

List of highest points reached in the Tour de France
Year	Stage	Climb	Elevation (Note: The elevation points are taken at the passed summit.)	Mountain range	Coordinates	Category (Note: The "Category" column refers to the system used for the mountains classification in the Tour de France to determine each climb's difficulty. It began in the 1947 Tour with two categories named 1 and 2 (or A and B). A third category was added in 1949 and a fourth in 1962. A special hors catégorie (HC) was introduced in 1979, given to the most difficult climbs designated as "beyond categorization".)	First cyclist to summit	Ref
1903	2	Col de la République ^{~}	1,161 m (3,809 ft) ^{^}	Mont Pilat	45°19′58″N 4°28′49″E	—N/a	Hippolyte Aucouturier (FRA)	
1904	2	Col de la République	1,161 m (3,809 ft)	Mont Pilat	45°19′58″N 4°28′49″E	—N/a	Antoine Fauré (FRA)	
1905	4	Col Bayard ^{~}	1,264 m (4,147 ft) ^{^}	Dauphiné Alps	44°36′45″N 6°4′52″E	—N/a	Julien Maitron (FRA)	
1906	5	Col Bayard	1,264 m (4,147 ft)	Dauphiné Alps	44°36′45″N 6°4′52″E	—N/a	René Pottier (FRA)	
1907	5	Col de Porte ^{~}	1,326 m (4,350 ft) ^{^}	Chartreuse	45°17′24″N 5°46′1″E	—N/a	Émile Georget (FRA)	
1908	5	Col de Porte	1,326 m (4,350 ft)	Chartreuse	45°17′24″N 5°46′1″E	—N/a	Georges Passerieu (FRA)	
1909	5	Col de Porte	1,326 m (4,350 ft)	Chartreuse	45°17′24″N 5°46′1″E	—N/a	François Faber (LUX)	
1910	10	Col du Tourmalet ^{~}	2,115 m (6,939 ft) ^{^}	Pyrenees	42°54′29″N 0°8′42″E	—N/a	Octave Lapize (FRA)	
1911	5	Col du Galibier ^{~}	2,556 m (8,386 ft) ^{^}	Dauphiné Alps	45°3′50″N 6°24′28″E	—N/a	Émile Georget (FRA)	
1912	5	Col du Galibier	2,556 m (8,386 ft)	Dauphiné Alps	45°3′50″N 6°24′28″E	—N/a	Eugène Christophe (FRA)	
1913	11	Col du Galibier	2,556 m (8,386 ft)	Dauphiné Alps	45°3′50″N 6°24′28″E	—N/a	Marcel Buysse (BEL)	
1914	11	Col du Galibier	2,556 m (8,386 ft)	Dauphiné Alps	45°3′50″N 6°24′28″E	—N/a	Henri Pélissier (FRA)	
1915– 1918	Not held during World War I							
1919	11	Col du Galibier	2,556 m (8,386 ft)	Dauphiné Alps	45°3′50″N 6°24′28″E	—N/a	Honoré Barthélémy (FRA)	
1920	11	Col du Galibier	2,556 m (8,386 ft)	Dauphiné Alps	45°3′50″N 6°24′28″E	—N/a	Firmin Lambot (BEL)	
1921	11	Col du Galibier	2,556 m (8,386 ft)	Dauphiné Alps	45°3′50″N 6°24′28″E	—N/a	Honoré Barthélémy (FRA)	
1922	11	Col du Galibier	2,556 m (8,386 ft)	Dauphiné Alps	45°3′50″N 6°24′28″E	—N/a	Émile Masson (BEL)	
1923	11	Col du Galibier	2,556 m (8,386 ft)	Dauphiné Alps	45°3′50″N 6°24′28″E	—N/a	Henri Pélissier (FRA)	
1924	11	Col du Galibier	2,556 m (8,386 ft)	Dauphiné Alps	45°3′50″N 6°24′28″E	—N/a	Bartolomeo Aimo (ITA)	
1925	14	Col du Galibier	2,556 m (8,386 ft)	Dauphiné Alps	45°3′50″N 6°24′28″E	—N/a	Lucien Buysse (BEL)	
1926	15	Col du Galibier	2,556 m (8,386 ft)	Dauphiné Alps	45°3′50″N 6°24′28″E	—N/a	Omer Huyse (BEL)	
1927	17	Col du Galibier	2,556 m (8,386 ft)	Dauphiné Alps	45°3′50″N 6°24′28″E	—N/a	Antonin Magne (FRA)	
1928	14	Col du Galibier	2,556 m (8,386 ft)	Dauphiné Alps	45°3′50″N 6°24′28″E	—N/a	Auguste Verdyck (BEL)	
1929	15	Col du Galibier	2,556 m (8,386 ft)	Dauphiné Alps	45°3′50″N 6°24′28″E	—N/a	Gaston Rebry (BEL)	
1930	16	Col du Galibier	2,556 m (8,386 ft)	Dauphiné Alps	45°3′50″N 6°24′28″E	—N/a	Pierre Magne (FRA)	
1931	17	Col du Galibier	2,556 m (8,386 ft)	Dauphiné Alps	45°3′50″N 6°24′28″E	—N/a	Jef Demuysere (BEL)	
1932	13	Col du Galibier	2,556 m (8,386 ft)	Dauphiné Alps	45°3′50″N 6°24′28″E	—N/a	Francesco Camusso (ITA)	
1933	7	Col du Galibier	2,556 m (8,386 ft)	Dauphiné Alps	45°3′50″N 6°24′28″E	—N/a	Vicente Trueba (ESP)	
1934	7	Col du Galibier	2,556 m (8,386 ft)	Dauphiné Alps	45°3′50″N 6°24′28″E	—N/a	Fédérico Ezquerra (ESP)	
1935	7	Col du Galibier	2,556 m (8,386 ft)	Dauphiné Alps	45°3′50″N 6°24′28″E	—N/a	Gabriel Ruozzi (FRA)	
1936	7	Col du Galibier	2,556 m (8,386 ft)	Dauphiné Alps	45°3′50″N 6°24′28″E	—N/a	Fédérico Ezquerra (ESP)	
1937	7	Col du Galibier	2,556 m (8,386 ft)	Dauphiné Alps	45°3′50″N 6°24′28″E	—N/a	Gino Bartali (ITA)	
1938	15	Col de l'Iseran ^{~}	2,770 m (9,088 ft) ^{^}	Graian Alps	45°25′1″N 7°1′51″E	—N/a	Félicien Vervaecke (BEL)	
1939	16b	Col de l'Iseran	2,770 m (9,088 ft)	Graian Alps	45°25′1″N 7°1′51″E	—N/a	Sylvère Maes (BEL)	
1940– 1946	Not held during World War II							
1947	8	Col du Galibier	2,556 m (8,386 ft)	Dauphiné Alps	45°3′50″N 6°24′28″E	1	Fermo Camellini (ITA)	
1948	14	Col du Galibier	2,556 m (8,386 ft)	Dauphiné Alps	45°3′50″N 6°24′28″E	2	Lucien Teisseire (FRA)	
1949	17	Col de l'Iseran	2,770 m (9,088 ft)	Graian Alps	45°25′1″N 7°1′51″E	1	Giuseppe Tacca (FRA)	
1950	18	Col d'Izoard ^{~}	2,360 m (7,743 ft)	Cottian Alps	44°49′12″N 6°44′7″E	1	Louison Bobet (FRA)	
1951	20	Col d'Izoard	2,360 m (7,743 ft)	Cottian Alps	44°49′12″N 6°44′7″E	1	Fausto Coppi (ITA)	
1952	11	Col du Galibier	2,556 m (8,386 ft)	Dauphiné Alps	45°3′50″N 6°24′28″E	1	Fausto Coppi (ITA)	
1953	18	Col d'Izoard	2,360 m (7,743 ft)	Cottian Alps	44°49′12″N 6°44′7″E	1	Louison Bobet (FRA)	
1954	19	Col du Galibier	2,556 m (8,386 ft)	Dauphiné Alps	45°3′50″N 6°24′28″E	1	Federico Bahamontes (ESP)	
1955	8	Col du Galibier	2,556 m (8,386 ft)	Dauphiné Alps	45°3′50″N 6°24′28″E	1	Charly Gaul (LUX)	
1956	17	Col d'Izoard	2,360 m (7,743 ft)	Cottian Alps	44°49′12″N 6°44′7″E	1	Valentin Huot (FRA)	
1957	10	Col du Galibier	2,556 m (8,386 ft)	Dauphiné Alps	45°3′50″N 6°24′28″E	1	Marcel Janssens (BEL)	
1958	20	Col d'Izoard	2,360 m (7,743 ft)	Cottian Alps	44°49′12″N 6°44′7″E	1	Federico Bahamontes (ESP)	
1959	18	Col de l'Iseran	2,770 m (9,088 ft)	Graian Alps	45°25′1″N 7°1′51″E	1	Adolf Christian (AUT)	
1960	16	Col d'Izoard	2,360 m (7,743 ft)	Cottian Alps	44°49′12″N 6°44′7″E	1	Imerio Massignan (ITA)	
1961	17	Col du Tourmalet	2,115 m (6,939 ft)	Pyrenees	42°54′29″N 0°8′42″E	1	Marcel Queheille (FRA)	
1962	18	Cime de la Bonette ^{~}	2,802 m (9,193 ft) ^{^}	Maritime Alps	44°19′18″N 6°48′25″E	1	Federico Bahamontes (ESP)	
1963	16	Col de l'Iseran	2,770 m (9,088 ft)	Graian Alps	45°25′1″N 7°1′51″E	1	Fernando Manzaneque (ESP)	
1964	9	Cime de la Bonette	2,802 m (9,193 ft)	Maritime Alps	44°19′18″N 6°48′25″E	1	Federico Bahamontes (ESP)	
1965	16	Col d'Izoard	2,360 m (7,743 ft)	Cottian Alps	44°49′12″N 6°44′7″E	1	Joaquim Galera (ESP)	
1966	16	Col du Galibier	2,556 m (8,386 ft)	Dauphiné Alps	45°3′50″N 6°24′28″E	1	Julio Jiménez (ESP)	
1967	10	Col du Galibier	2,556 m (8,386 ft)	Dauphiné Alps	45°3′50″N 6°24′28″E	1	Julio Jiménez (ESP)	
1968	13	Port d'Envalira	2,407 m (7,897 ft)	Pyrenees	42°32′24″N 1°43′10″E	1	Aurelio González Puente (ESP)	
1969	10	Col du Galibier	2,556 m (8,386 ft)	Dauphiné Alps	45°3′50″N 6°24′28″E	1	Eddy Merckx (BEL)	
1970	19	Col du Tourmalet	2,115 m (6,939 ft)	Pyrenees	42°54′29″N 0°8′42″E	1	Andrés Gandarias (ESP)	
1971	16b	Col du Tourmalet	2,115 m (6,939 ft)	Pyrenees	42°54′29″N 0°8′42″E	1	Lucien Van Impe (BEL)	
1972	14a	Col du Galibier	2,556 m (8,386 ft)	Dauphiné Alps	45°3′50″N 6°24′28″E	1	Joop Zoetemelk (NED)	
1973	8	Col du Galibier	2,556 m (8,386 ft)	Dauphiné Alps	45°3′50″N 6°24′28″E	1	Luis Ocaña (ESP)	
1974	11	Col du Galibier	2,556 m (8,386 ft)	Dauphiné Alps	45°3′50″N 6°24′28″E	1	Vicente López Carril (ESP)	
1975	16	Col d'Izoard	2,360 m (7,743 ft)	Cottian Alps	44°49′12″N 6°44′7″E	1	Bernard Thévenet (FRA)	
1976	15	Col du Tourmalet (Note: Before the 1976 Tour de France, the Galibier was stated by the media to be the highest climb of the route but it was closed earlier in the year for repairs to the summit tunnel.)	2,115 m (6,939 ft)	Pyrenees	42°54′29″N 0°8′42″E	1	Francisco Galdós (ESP)	
1977	2	Col du Tourmalet	2,115 m (6,939 ft)	Pyrenees	42°54′29″N 0°8′42″E	1	Lucien Van Impe (BEL)	
1978	11	Col du Tourmalet	2,115 m (6,939 ft)	Pyrenees	42°54′29″N 0°8′42″E	1	Michel Pollentier (BEL)	
1979	17	Col du Galibier	2,642 m (8,668 ft)	Dauphiné Alps	45°3′50″N 6°24′28″E	HC	Lucien Van Impe (BEL)	
1980	17	Col du Galibier	2,642 m (8,668 ft)	Dauphiné Alps	45°3′50″N 6°24′28″E	HC	Johan De Muynck (BEL)	
1981	19	Col de la Madeleine	2,000 m (6,562 ft)	Graian Alps	45°26′5″N 6°22′32″E	1	Lucien Van Impe (BEL)	
1982	16 ^{*}	Alpe d'Huez	1,850 m (6,070 ft)	Western Alps	45°3′37″N 6°4′17″E	HC	Beat Breu (SUI)	
1983	10	Col du Tourmalet	2,115 m (6,939 ft)	Pyrenees	42°54′29″N 0°8′42″E	HC	José Patrocinio Jiménez (COL)	
1984	18	Col du Galibier	2,642 m (8,668 ft)	Dauphiné Alps	45°3′50″N 6°24′28″E	HC	Francisco Rodríguez Maldonado (COL)	
1985	17	Col du Tourmalet	2,115 m (6,939 ft)	Pyrenees	42°54′29″N 0°8′42″E	HC	Pello Ruiz Cabestany (ESP)	
1986	18	Col du Galibier	2,642 m (8,668 ft)	Dauphiné Alps	45°3′50″N 6°24′28″E	HC	Luis Herrera (COL)	
1987	21	Col du Galibier	2,642 m (8,668 ft)	Dauphiné Alps	45°3′50″N 6°24′28″E	HC	Federico Muñoz (ESP)	
1988	15	Col du Tourmalet	2,115 m (6,939 ft)	Pyrenees	42°54′29″N 0°8′42″E	HC	Laudelino Cubino (ESP)	
1989	17	Col du Galibier	2,642 m (8,668 ft)	Dauphiné Alps	45°3′50″N 6°24′28″E	HC	Gert-Jan Theunisse (NED)	
1990	16	Col du Tourmalet	2,115 m (6,939 ft)	Pyrenees	42°54′29″N 0°8′42″E	HC	Miguel Ángel Martínez Torres (ESP)	
1991	13	Col du Tourmalet	2,115 m (6,939 ft)	Pyrenees	42°54′29″N 0°8′42″E	HC	Claudio Chiappucci (ITA)	
1992	13	Col de l'Iseran	2,770 m (9,088 ft)	Graian Alps	45°25′1″N 7°1′51″E	HC	Claudio Chiappucci (ITA)	
1993	11	Cime de la Bonette	2,802 m (9,193 ft)	Maritime Alps	44°19′18″N 6°48′25″E	HC	Robert Millar (GBR)	
1994	17 ^{*}	Val Thorens ^{~}	2,275 m (7,464 ft)	Graian Alps	45°17′53″N 6°34′48″E	HC	Nelson Rodríguez Serna (COL)	
1995	15	Col du Tourmalet	2,115 m (6,939 ft)	Pyrenees	42°54′29″N 0°8′42″E	HC	Richard Virenque (FRA)	
1996	9 ^{*}	Sestriere (Note: Two higher planned climbs were both cancelled because of bad weather, the Col du Galibier at 2,642 m (8,668 ft), and the Col de l'Iseran at 2,770 m (9,088 ft).)	2,035 m (6,677 ft)	Cottian Alps	44°57′N 6°53′E	1	Bjarne Riis (DEN)	
1997	10 & 11	Port d'Envalira	2,407 m (7,897 ft)	Pyrenees	42°32′24″N 1°43′10″E	HC	Richard Virenque (FRA)	
1998	15	Col du Galibier	2,642 m (8,668 ft)	Dauphiné Alps	45°3′50″N 6°24′28″E	HC	Marco Pantani (ITA)	
1999	9	Col du Galibier	2,642 m (8,668 ft)	Dauphiné Alps	45°3′50″N 6°24′28″E	HC	José Luis Arrieta (ESP)	
2000	15	Col du Galibier	2,642 m (8,668 ft)	Dauphiné Alps	45°3′50″N 6°24′28″E	HC	Pascal Hervé (FRA)	
2001	14	Col du Tourmalet	2,115 m (6,939 ft)	Pyrenees	42°54′29″N 0°8′42″E	HC	Sven Montgomery (SUI)	
2002	16	Col du Galibier	2,642 m (8,668 ft)	Dauphiné Alps	45°3′50″N 6°24′28″E	HC	Santiago Botero (COL)	
2003	8	Col du Galibier	2,642 m (8,668 ft)	Dauphiné Alps	45°3′50″N 6°24′28″E	HC	Stefano Garzelli (ITA)	
2004	17	Col de la Madeleine	2,000 m (6,562 ft)	Graian Alps	45°26′5″N 6°22′32″E	HC	Gilberto Simoni (ITA)	
2005	11	Col du Galibier	2,642 m (8,668 ft)	Dauphiné Alps	45°3′50″N 6°24′28″E	HC	Alexander Vinokourov (KAZ)	
2006	16	Col du Galibier	2,642 m (8,668 ft)	Dauphiné Alps	45°3′50″N 6°24′28″E	HC	Michael Rasmussen (DEN)	
2007	9	Col de l'Iseran	2,770 m (9,088 ft)	Graian Alps	45°25′1″N 7°1′51″E	HC	Yaroslav Popovych (UKR)	
2008	16	Cime de la Bonette	2,802 m (9,193 ft)	Maritime Alps	44°19′18″N 6°48′25″E	HC	John-Lee Augustyn (RSA)	
2009	16	Col du Grand Saint-Bernard	2,470 m (8,104 ft)	Pennine Alps	45°52′08″N 7°10′14″E	HC	~~Franco Pellizotti (ITA)~~ (Note: In March 2011, all of Italian Franco Pellizotti's results since 7 May 2009 were disqualified after the Court of Arbitration for Sport found his biological passport indicated irregular values.)	
2010	17 ^{*}	Col du Tourmalet	2,115 m (6,939 ft)	Pyrenees	42°54′29″N 0°8′42″E	HC	Andy Schleck (LUX)	
2011	18	Col Agnel	2,744 m (9,003 ft)	Cottian Alps	44°41′2″N 6°58′46″E	HC	Maxim Iglinsky (KAZ)	
2012	16	Col du Tourmalet	2,115 m (6,939 ft)	Pyrenees	42°54′29″N 0°8′42″E	HC	Thomas Voeckler (FRA)	
2013	8	Port de Pailhères	2,001 m (6,565 ft)	Pyrenees	42°44′0″N 1°59′33″E	HC	Nairo Quintana (COL)	
2014	14	Col d'Izoard	2,360 m (7,743 ft)	Cottian Alps	44°49′12″N 6°44′7″E	HC	Joaquim Rodríguez (ESP)	
2015	17	Col d'Allos (Note: The Col du Galibier was planned to be the highest point of elevation on the 2015 Tour de France, but landslides prior to the race forced its cancellation.)	2,250 m (7,382 ft)	Southern Alps	44°17′50″N 6°35′39″E	1	Simon Geschke (GER)	
2016	10	Port d'Envalira	2,407 m (7,897 ft)	Pyrenees	42°32′24″N 1°43′10″E	1	Rui Costa (POR)	
2017	17	Col du Galibier	2,642 m (8,668 ft)	Dauphiné Alps	45°3′50″N 6°24′28″E	HC	Primož Roglič (SLO)	
2018	17 ^{*}	Col de Portet ^{~}	2,215 m (7,267 ft)	Pyrenees	42°49′59″N 0°14′12″E	HC	Nairo Quintana (COL)	
2019	19 ^{*} (Note: Stage 19 of the 2019 Tour de France was stopped atop the Col de l'Iseran after hailstorms and mudslides made the road impracticable near Val-d'Isère, before the planned final climb and finish at Tignes. The stage victory was not awarded.)	Col de l'Iseran	2,770 m (9,088 ft)	Graian Alps	45°25′1″N 7°1′51″E	HC	Egan Bernal (COL)	
2020	17 ^{*}	Col de la Loze ^{~}	2,304 m (7,559 ft)	Graian Alps	45°25′1″N 07°01′51″E	HC	Miguel Ángel López (COL)	
2021	15	Port d'Envalira	2,407 m (7,897 ft)	Pyrenees	42°32′24″N 1°43′10″E	1	Nairo Quintana (COL)	
2022	11	Col du Galibier	2,642 m (8,668 ft)	Dauphiné Alps	45°3′50″N 6°24′28″E	HC	Warren Barguil (FRA)	
2022	12	Col du Galibier	2,642 m (8,668 ft)	Dauphiné Alps	45°3′50″N 6°24′28″E	HC	Anthony Perez (FRA)	
2023	17	Col de la Loze	2,304 m (7,559 ft)	Graian Alps	45°25′1″N 07°01′51″E	HC	Felix Gall (AUT)	
2024	19	Cime de la Bonette	2,802 m (9,193 ft)	Maritime Alps	44°19′18″N 6°48′25″E	HC	Richard Carapaz (ECU)	
2025	18 ^{*}	Col de la Loze	2,304 m (7,559 ft)	Graian Alps	45°25′1″N 07°01′51″E	HC	Ben O'Connor (AUS)	
2026	20	Col du Galibier	2,642 m (8,668 ft)	Dauphiné Alps	45°3′50″N 6°24′28″E	HC	Richard Carapaz (ECU)	

== See also ==
- Souvenir Henri Desgrange – an award given in the Tour de France sometimes at its highest reached point
- Souvenir Jacques Goddet – an award given in the Tour de France mostly atop the Col du Tourmalet

== Bibliography ==
- Augendre, Jacques (2019). Guide historique [Historical guide] (PDF) (in French). Paris: Amaury Sport Organisation. Archived (PDF) from the original on 27 November 2019.
- Cossins, Peter (2013). Le Tour 100: The Definitive History of the World's Greatest Race. London: Cassell. ISBN 978-1-84403-759-9.
- Cossins, Peter (2017). Butcher, Blacksmith, Acrobat, Sweep: The Tale of the First Tour de France. London: Yellow Jersey Press. ISBN 978-0-224-10065-6.
- Dauncey, Hugh; Hare, Geoff (2003). The Tour de France, 1903–2003: A Century of Sporting Structures, Meanings and Values. London: Frank Cass & Co. ISBN 978-0-203-50241-9.
- Friebe, Daniel; Goding, Pete (2017). Mountain High: Europe's 50 Greatest Cycle Climbs. London: Quercus. ISBN 978-0-85738-625-0.
- Hanold, Maylon (2012). World Sports: A Reference Handbook. Santa Barbara, CA: ABC-CLIO. ISBN 978-1-59884-779-6.
- Heijmans, Jeroen; Mallon, Bill (2011). Historical Dictionary of Cycling. Historical Dictionaries of Sports. Lanham, MD: Scarecrow Press. ISBN 978-0-8108-7175-5.
- Hoffman, Jay (2014). Physiological Aspects of Sport Training and Performance (2 ed.). Champaign, IL: Human Kinetics. ISBN 978-1-4925-8366-0.
- Lowe, Felix (2014). Climbs and Punishment. London: Bantam Press. ISBN 978-0-593-07334-6.
- van den Akker, Pieter (2018). Tour de France Rules and Statistics: 1903–2018. Self-published. ISBN 978-1-79398-080-9.
- Wheatcroft, Geoffrey (2004). Le Tour: A History of the Tour de France. London: Simon & Schuster. ISBN 978-0-7434-4992-2.
