= 1921 Tour de France =

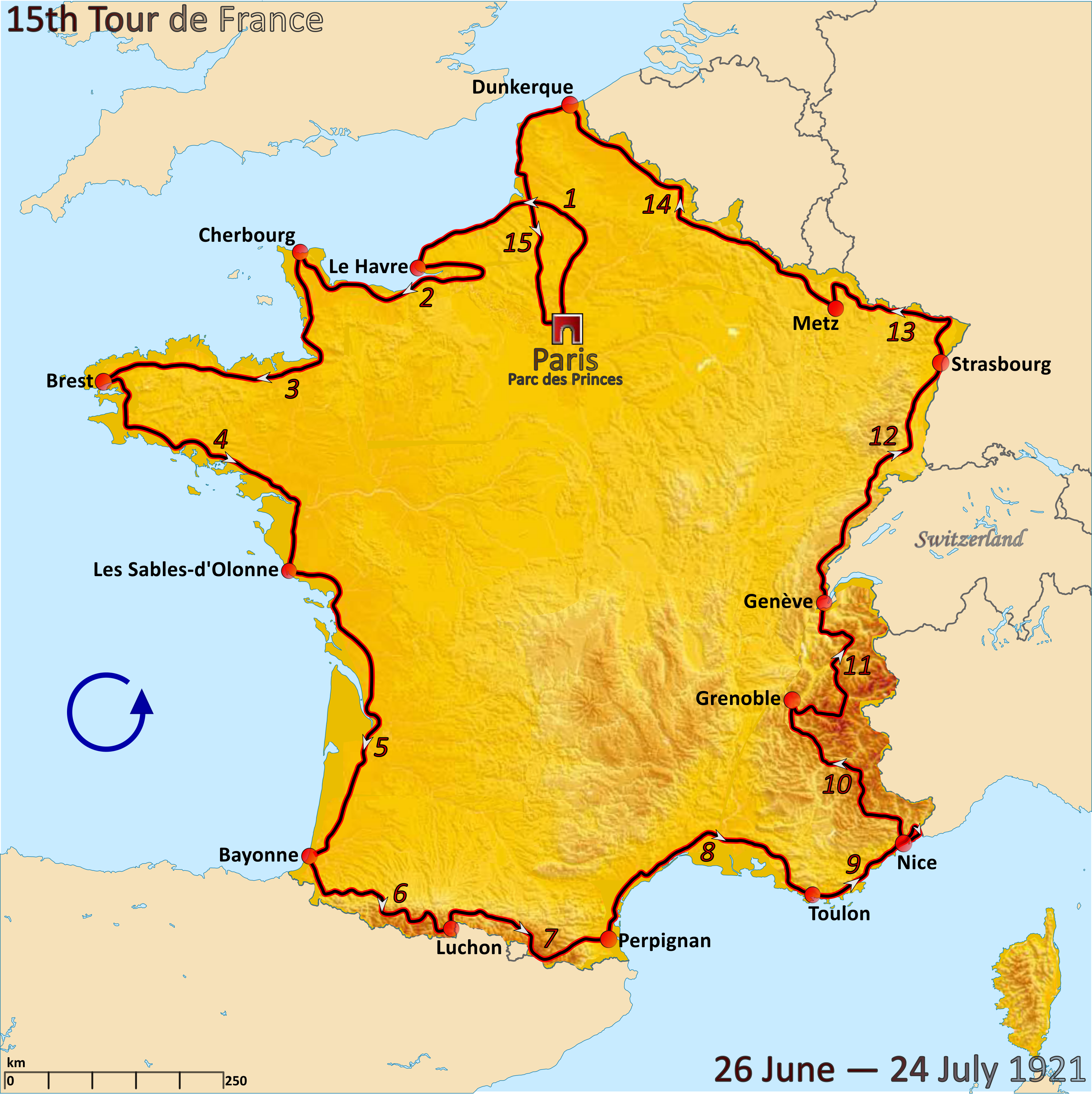
- Route of the 1921 Tour de France followed counterclockwise, starting in Paris

Race details
- Dates: 26 June – 24 July 1921
- Stages: 15
- Distance: 5,485 km (3,408 mi)
- Winning time: 221h 50' 26"

Results
Jersey awarded to the overall winner	Winner	Léon Scieur (BEL)	(1st class)
	Second	Hector Heusghem (BEL)	(1st class)
	Third	Honoré Barthélemy (FRA)	(1st class)

The 1921 Tour de France was the 15th edition of the Tour de France, taking place 26 June to 24 July. The total distance was 5,485 km (3,408 mi) and the average speed of the riders was 24.720 km/h. The race was won by Belgian Leon Scieur. The Belgians dominated the entire race, partly due to the absence of the French Pélissier brothers, who were on bad terms with the Tour organisation. Scieur's victory was largely uncontested; Hector Heusghem came close after the sixth stage, but lost time later. The organisation tried to get the cyclists to attack more by several means, but this failed.

== Innovations and changes ==
The 1920 Tour de France had been dominated by Belgian cyclists, who won twelve of the fifteen stages, and the top seven of the overall classification. The French cyclists Henri and Francis Pélissier had left the 1920 Tour de France after Henri received a penalty from the Tour organisation for throwing away a tire, and they were still fighting. Therefore, the Pélissier brothers did not join the 1921 Tour de France. Two veteran cyclists who did join the race were Ernest Paul and Lucien Pothier, both forty years old. Paul rode his first Tour de France in 1908, while Pothier had started in the first Tour de France in 1903, and finished second.

The winner of 1920, Philippe Thys, was the dominant stage racer of the time, but he was recovering from an illness and could not compete for the victory.

The economic impact of World War I was still not over, so as in the previous years there were not sponsored teams, but the cycling companies had bundled their forces under the nick La Sportive. The cyclists were divided in two categories, this time named 1ère class (first class), the professionals, and 2ème classe (second class), the amateurs. This year, some of the second class cyclists would finish higher than some of the first class cyclists.

The 1921 Tour de France saw the introduction of foreign press. They followed the race in their own cars. For the first time, an inhabitant from Monaco joined the Tour de France. Laurent Devalle needed more than twenty-seven hours for the fifth stage, and would finally give up in the eleventh stage.

== Race overview ==
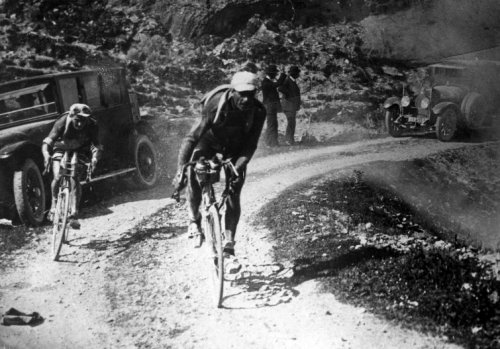
Léon Scieur during the 1921 Tour de France, which he won

Overall, the Tour did not have any major events. This troubled the Tour organiser and newspaper owner Henri Desgrange, who sanctioned cyclists that were not combative enough in his view.

In the first stage, Honoré Barthélemy had to fix a flat tire eleven times. Despite this, he still finished in second place behind Louis Mottiat, with Léon Scieur in third place. In the second stage, won by Romain Bellenger, Scieur finished in second place, almost one hour before Mottiat and Barthélemy, so Scieur was leading the race. Scieur improved his lead by winning the third stage, and was already leading by 12'38" over his closest opponent, Hector Heusghem. In the fourth and fifth stage, both won by Mottiat, Scieur managed to increase his lead to almost half an hour.

In the sixth stage, the first real mountains were to be climbed. Hector Heusghem took off on the Tourmalet, reached the top there first, rode solo over the Aspin and the Peyresourde and finished with a 24-minute margin. This brought the difference between Scieur and Heusghem back to slightly over four minutes. The press predicted a new duel between Scieur and Heusghem.

The seventh and eighth stage did not change this difference. In the ninth stage the race was decided, as Heusghem lost ten minutes to Scieur. From that moment it was easy for Scieur to control the race, and the other cyclists could only ride for stage victories. In the tenth stage, Scieur punctured on the climb to Allos. It was an unwritten rule that cyclists would not attack when opponents were repairing their bicycle, but Heusghem was desperate and broke this rule. Scieur was angry, and after he completed his repair he caught back Heusghem. He then told Heusghem that this was not the way professional cyclists behaved, dropped Heusghem, and crossed the finish line first, and even added another six minutes to his lead.

The French crowd was pleased by the stage victory of Félix Goethals in stage eleven. In the twelfth stage Heusghem won, albeit in the same time as Scieur. Henri Desgrange was angry at the cyclists for not attempting to beat Scieur, so he had the cyclists leave separately in the thirteenth stage. The "second class" cyclists started two hours earlier than the sponsored "first class" cyclists. Although the stage was won by an unsponsored cyclist from the second class, Félix Sellier, this did not help for the general classification, as Scieur and Heusghem still finished together. The Tour organisers wanted the second class cyclists to start two hours later in the fourteenth stage, but they threatened with a strike, and the cyclists could start together. The fourteenth stage had a remarkable incident: Scieur's wheel broke, and 11 spokes were broken. According to the rules, a broken item could only be replaced when repair was not possible. Because there was no Tour official close to Scieur who could verify that the wheel was broken beyond repair, Scieur strapped the broken wheel to his back and rode with it for more than 300 kilometres (190 mi), which left scars on his back that remained there for years. In the last stage, Scieur finished a few minutes behind Heusghem, but his victory was never in danger.

== Results ==
In each stage, all cyclists started together. The cyclist who reached the finish first, was the winner of the stage. The time that each cyclist required to finish the stage was recorded. For the general classification, these times were added up; the cyclist with the least accumulated time was the race leader, identified by the yellow jersey.

=== Stage winners ===
Stage characteristics and winners
Stage	Date	Course	Distance	Type (Note: In 1921, there was no distinction in the rules between plain stages and mountain stages; the icons shown here indicate which stages included mountains.)	Winner	Race leader
1	26 June	Paris to Le Havre	388 km (241 mi)	Plain stage	Louis Mottiat (BEL)	Louis Mottiat (BEL)
2	28 June	Le Havre to Cherbourg-en-Cotentin	364 km (226 mi)	Plain stage	Romain Bellenger (FRA)	Leon Scieur (BEL)
3	30 June	Cherbourg to Brest	405 km (252 mi)	Plain stage	Leon Scieur (BEL)	Leon Scieur (BEL)
4	2 July	Brest to Les Sables-d'Olonne	412 km (256 mi)	Plain stage	Louis Mottiat (BEL)	Leon Scieur (BEL)
5	4 July	Les Sables-d'Olonne to Bayonne	482 km (300 mi)	Plain stage	Louis Mottiat (BEL)	Leon Scieur (BEL)
6	6 July	Bayonne to Luchon	326 km (203 mi)	Stage with mountain(s)	Hector Heusghem (BEL)	Leon Scieur (BEL)
7	8 July	Luchon to Perpignan	323 km (201 mi)	Stage with mountain(s)	Louis Mottiat (BEL)	Leon Scieur (BEL)
8	10 July	Perpignan to Toulon	411 km (255 mi)	Plain stage	Luigi Lucotti (ITA)	Leon Scieur (BEL)
9	12 July	Toulon to Nice	272 km (169 mi)	Stage with mountain(s)	Firmin Lambot (BEL)	Leon Scieur (BEL)
10	14 July	Nice to Grenoble	333 km (207 mi)	Stage with mountain(s)	Leon Scieur (BEL)	Leon Scieur (BEL)
11	16 July	Grenoble to Geneva	325 km (202 mi)	Stage with mountain(s)	Félix Goethals (FRA)	Leon Scieur (BEL)
12	18 July	Geneva to Strasbourg	371 km (231 mi)	Plain stage	Honoré Barthélemy (FRA)	Leon Scieur (BEL)
13	20 July	Strasbourg to Metz	300 km (190 mi)	Plain stage	Félix Sellier (BEL)	Leon Scieur (BEL)
14	22 July	Metz to Dunkerque	433 km (269 mi)	Plain stage	Félix Goethals (FRA)	Leon Scieur (BEL)
15	24 July	Dunkerque to Paris	340 km (210 mi)	Plain stage	Félix Goethals (FRA)	Leon Scieur (BEL)
	Total		5,485 km (3,408 mi)			

=== General classification ===
The final general classification, calculated by adding the stages times, was won by Léon Scieur, who received 15.000 Francs. Originally, the two results of the two classes were separated, and the winner of the second class, Victor Lenaers, reportedly won 20.000 Francs in total during this race. Modern sources combine the results for the two groups.

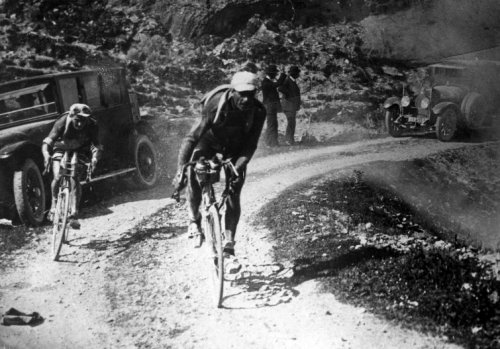
Léon Scieur, the overall winner of the 1921 Tour de France.

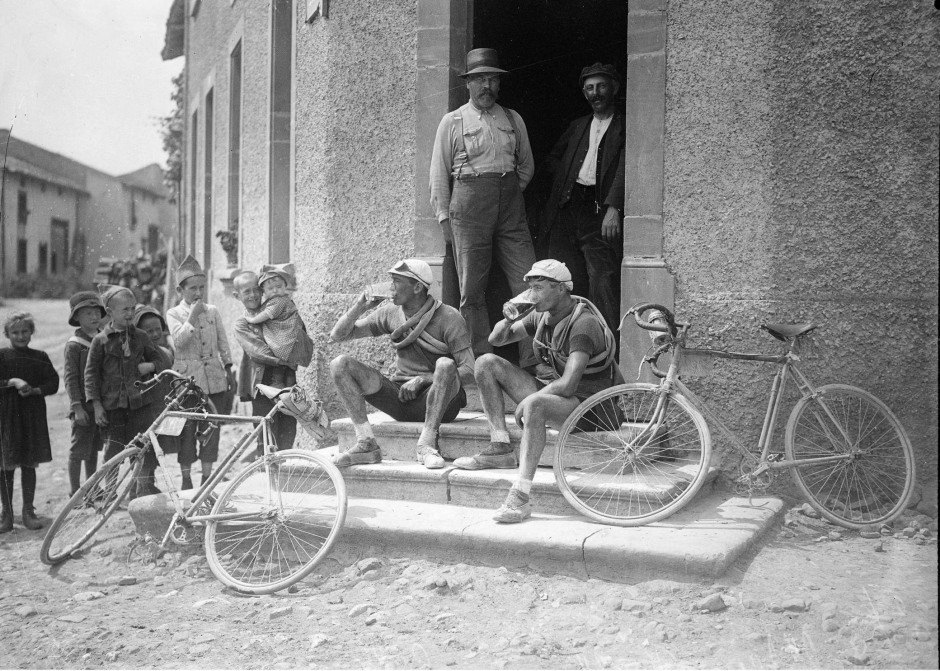
Henri Colle and Charles Parel drinking a beer in a tavern in Dalstein in 1921.

Final general classification (1–10)
Rank	Rider	Class	Time
1	Leon Scieur (BEL)	1	221h 50' 26"
2	Hector Heusghem (BEL)	1	+ 18' 36"
3	Honore Barthelemy (FRA)	1	+ 2h 01' 00"
4	Luigi Lucotti (ITA)	1	+ 2h 39' 18"
5	Hector Tiberghien (BEL)	1	+ 4h 33' 19"
6	Victor Lenaers (BEL)	2	+ 4h 53' 23"
7	Leon Despontin (BEL)	2	+ 5h 01' 54"
8	Camile Leroy (BEL)	2	+ 7h 56' 27"
9	Firmin Lambot (BEL)	1	+ 8h 26' 25"
10	Félix Goethals (FRA)	1	+ 8h 42' 26"

Final general classification (11–38)
Rank	Rider	Class	Time
11	Louis Mottiat (BEL)	1	+ 8h 51' 24"
12	Eugène Dhers (FRA)	2	+ 9h 44' 36"
13	Henri Ferrara (FRA)	2	+ 11h 58' 24"
14	Noel Amenc (FRA)	2	+ 12h 37' 23"
15	Joseph Muller (FRA)	2	+ 12h 59' 08"
16	Félix Sellier (BEL)	2	+ 13h 56' 45"
17	Henri Colle (SUI)	2	+ 15h 02' 22"
18	Enrico Sala (ITA)	2	+ 19h 09' 18"
19	Guglielmo Ceccherelli (ITA)	2	+ 22h 49' 12"
20	Auguste Meyer (FRA)	2	+ 22h 53' 43"
21	Benjamin Javaux (BEL)	2	+ 25h 25' 34"
22	Pierre Hudsyn (BEL)	2	+ 25h 53' 44"
23	Joseph Normand (FRA)	2	+ 27h 05' 40"
24	Etienne Dorfeuille (FRA)	2	+ 27h 07' 44"
25	Charles Raboisson (FRA)	2	+ 27h 57' 32"
26	Jules Deloffre (FRA)	2	+ 31h 09' 48"
27	Ernest Paul (FRA)	2	+ 32h 26' 34"
28	Edgard Roy (FRA)	2	+ 32h 43' 15"
29	Charles Parel (SUI)	2	+ 34h 29' 08"
30	Paul Coppens (FRA)	2	+ 34h 50' 25"
31	Jean Kienlen (FRA)	2	+ 36h 18' 06"
32	Lucien Pothier (FRA)	2	+ 41h 45' 11"
33	Lucien Rocquebert (FRA)	2	+ 49h 37' 25"
34	Robert Constantin (FRA)	2	+ 57h 07' 39"
35	Charles Cento (FRA)	2	+ 57h 45' 21"
36	Georges Kamm (FRA)	2	+ 58h 00' 09"
37	Adrien Alpini (FRA)	2	+ 60h 34' 50"
38	Henri Catelan (FRA)	2	+ 62h 19' 57"

== Aftermath ==
As in the years before, the Belgian cyclists had dominated the entire race. The French press and audience did not like this, and wanted the brothers Pélissier, who did not join because of a fight with the Tour organisers, to enter the race again. They would ultimately do this in 1923, when Henri won the race as the first French cyclist in eleven years. The winner in 1921, Scieur, would start the Tour three more times, but would never win a stage again and never complete the race.

== Bibliography ==
- Augendre, Jacques (2016). "Guide historique" [Historical guide] (PDF). Tour de France (in French). Paris: Amaury Sport Organisation. Archived (PDF) from the original on 17 August 2016.
- McGann, Bill; McGann, Carol (2006). The Story of the Tour de France: 1903–1964. Vol. 1. Indianapolis, IN: Dog Ear Publishing. ISBN 978-1-59858-180-5.
- Thompson, Christopher S. (2008). The Tour de France: A Cultural History. Oakland, CA: University of California Press. ISBN 978-0-520-25630-9.
