= Dethier =

Dethier is a surname. Notable people with this surname includes:

- Édouard Dethier (1885-1962), Belgian classical violinist
- Gaston Dethier (1849-1933), American classic composer
- Nicolas Dethier (1888–1976), Belgian trade unionist and politician
- Sylvia Dethier (born 1965), retired Belgian athlete
- Victor Dethier (1892–1963), Belgian racing cyclist
- Vincent Dethier (1915–1993), American physiologist and entomologist
