= Belvaux (surname) =

Belvaux is a surname. Notable people with the surname include:

- Jean Belvaux (1894–1955), Belgian cyclist
- Lucas Belvaux (born 1961), Belgian actor and film director
- Rémy Belvaux (1967–2006), Belgian actor, director, producer, and screenwriter
