= Ransart =

Ransart may refer to:

- Ransart, Belgium, a former Belgian municipality and now part of the city of Charleroi
- Ransart, Pas-de-Calais, a commune in the Pas-de-Calais department in France
