= 1920 Liège–Bastogne–Liège =

Race details
- Dates: 6 June 1920
- Stages: 1
- Distance: 245 km (152 mi)
- Winning time: 7h 46' 00"

Results
	Winner	Léon Scieur (BEL)
	Second	Lucien Buysse (BEL)
	Third	Jacques Coomans (BEL)

The 1920 Liège–Bastogne–Liège was the tenth edition of the Liège–Bastogne–Liège cycle race and was held on 6 June 1920. The race started and finished in Liège. The race was won by Léon Scieur.

== General classification ==
Final general classification

Rank	Rider	Time
1	Léon Scieur (BEL)	7h 46' 00"
2	Lucien Buysse (BEL)	+ 0"
3	Jacques Coomans (BEL)	+ 4' 20"
4	Léon Despontin (BEL)	+ 6' 00"
5	Firmin Lambot (BEL)	+ 6' 30"
6	Léon Devos (BEL)	+ 7' 00"
7	Leon Kindermans (BEL)	+ 9' 30"
8	Victor Dethier (BEL)	+ 14' 30"
9	Arthur Van Branteghem (BEL)	+ 17' 00"
10	Louis Budts (BEL)	+ 17' 50"
