= 1912 Paris–Tours =

Race details
- Dates: 24 March 1912
- Stages: 1
- Distance: 246 km (153 mi)
- Winning time: 9h 17' 00"

Results
| | Winner | Louis Heusghem (BEL) |
| | Second | Charles Deruyter (BEL) |
| | Third | Lucien Petit-Breton (FRA) |

The 1912 Paris–Tours was the ninth edition of the Paris–Tours cycle race and was held on 24 March 1912. The race started in Paris and finished in Tours. The race was won by Louis Heusghem.

== General classification ==
Final general classification

| Rank | Rider | Time |
|---|---|---|
| 1 | Louis Heusghem (BEL) | 9h 17' 00" |
| 2 | Charles Deruyter (BEL) | + 2' 00" |
| 3 | Lucien Petit-Breton (FRA) | + 2' 00" |
| 4 | Andre Blaise (BEL) | + 5' 00" |
| 5 | Émile Georget (FRA) | + 5' 00" |
| 6 | François Faber (LUX) | + 9' 00" |
| 7 | Oscar Egg (SUI) | + 23' 00" |
| 8 | Maurice Léturgie (FRA) | + 23' 00" |
| 9 | Pierre-Joseph Heusghem (BEL) | + 36' 00" |
| 10 | Louis Engel (FRA) | + 37' 00" |
