= Auguste Meyer =

French cyclist

Personal information
- Born: 22 December 1893
- Died: 26 February 1984 (aged 90)

Cycling career
- Sport: Cycling
- Role: Rider

Auguste Meyer (22 December 1893 – 26 February 1984) was a French racing cyclist. He rode in the 1921 Tour de France.
