= Robert Constantin (cyclist) =

French cyclist

Personal information
- Born: 15 November 1896

Cycling career
- Sport: Cycling
- Role: Rider

Robert Constantin (born 15 November 1896, date of death unknown) was a French racing cyclist. He rode in the 1921 Tour de France.
