= Georges Kamm =

French cyclist (1894–1945)

Personal information
- Born: 4 July 1894
- Died: 4 February 1945 (aged 50)

Cycling career
- Sport: Cycling
- Role: Rider

Georges Kamm (4 July 1894 – 4 February 1945) was a French racing cyclist. He rode in the 1921 Tour de France.
