= André Coutte =

French cyclist

Personal information
- Born: 31 August 1896 Argenteuil
- Died: 23 September 1931 (aged 35) Argenteuil

Cycling career
- Sport: Cycling
- Role: Rider

André Coutte (31 August 1896 – 23 September 1931) was a French racing cyclist. He rode in the 1920 Tour de France.
