= Marius Matheron =

French cyclist

Personal information
- Born: 5 August 1893
- Died: 15 April 1980 (aged 86)

Cycling career
- Sport: Cycling
- Role: Rider

Marius Matheron (5 August 1893 – 15 April 1980) was a French racing cyclist. He rode in the 1920 Tour de France.
