= Henri Catelan =

French cyclist

Personal information
- Full name: Henri Catelan
- Born: 13 July 1895 Haute-Normandie, France
- Died: 16 June 1980 (aged 84) Le Havre, France

Cycling career
- Sport: Cycling
- Role: Rider

Henri Catelan (13 July 1895 – 16 June 1980) was a French racing cyclist. He finished in last place in the 1921 Tour de France.
