= Adrien Alpini =

French cyclist

Personal information
- Born: 9 December 1889
- Died: 12 December 1950 (aged 61)

Cycling career
- Sport: Cycling
- Role: Rider

Adrien Alpini (9 December 1889 – 12 December 1950) was a French racing cyclist. He rode in the 1920 Tour de France.
