= Jean Kienlen =

French cyclist

Personal information
- Born: 21 October 1892 Elsenheim, German Empire
- Died: 19 August 1954 (aged 61) Paris, France

Cycling career
- Sport: Cycling
- Role: Rider

Jean Kienlen (21 October 1897 – 19 August 1954) was a French racing cyclist. He first rode in the 1921 Tour de France, where he finished in 31st place. He rode again in 1922, 1923 and 1929.
