= Benjamin Javaux =

Belgian cyclist

Personal information
- Born: 3 March 1894
- Died: 17 October 1953 (aged 59)

Cycling career
- Sport: Cycling
- Role: Rider

Benjamin Javaux (3 March 1894 – 17 October 1953) was a Belgian racing cyclist. He rode in the 1921 Tour de France.
