= Charles Parel =

Swiss cyclist

Personal information
- Born: 25 November 1893
- Died: 6 March 1981 (aged 87)

Cycling career
- Sport: Cycling
- Role: Rider

Charles Parel (25 November 1893 – 6 March 1981) was a Swiss racing cyclist. He rode in the 1921 Tour de France.
