= Charles Raboisson =

French cyclist

Personal information
- Full name: Charles Raboisson
- Born: 26 September 1889 Saint-Omer, France
- Died: 11 May 1962 (aged 72)

Cycling career
- Sport: Cycling
- Role: Rider

Charles Raboisson (26 September 1889 – 11 May 1962) was a French racing cyclist. He finished in last place in the 1920 Tour de France.
