= La Sportive =

French professional road cycling team

Team information
- Registered: France
- Founded: 1918
- Disbanded: 1921
- Discipline: Road

Team name history
- 1919–1921: La Sportive

La Sportive is the name under which French cyclists rode in the first years after the First World War, when there was not enough money for conventional cycling teams.

== History ==
Many bicycle factories that sponsored cycling teams in the early 20th century suffered and some were destroyed during World War I. There was little money to sponsor a team so several businesses ran a joint team called La Sportive. to keep the sport alive. Alcyon, Armor, Automoto, Clément, La Française, Gladiator, Griffon, Hurtu, Labor, Liberator, Peugeot and Thomann are said to have equipped half the peloton and to have controlled the riders' salaries.

In the Tours de France of 1919, 1920 and 1921, all professional cyclists were sponsored by La Sportive, and because amateur cyclists had little chance to win, the winner of the Tour was also sponsored by La Sportive. Eugène Christophe was in a grey La Sportive jersey when, leading the 1919 Tour de France, Henri Desgrange gave him the Tour's first yellow jersey.

The consortium disappeared in 1922 when the companies restarted their own teams. They included Peugeot, the Automoto and the Alcyon. During the three years of the La Sportive consortium, the member companies were rebuilding their teams and it is possible these riders rode for these teams as well as La Sportive. In 1925, the old situation of cyclists riding in sponsored teams returned to the Tour de France.
