= Étienne Dorfeuille =

French cyclist

Personal information
- Born: 26 December 1892
- Died: 25 July 1962 (aged 69)

Cycling career
- Sport: Cycling
- Role: Rider

Étienne Dorfeuille (26 December 1892 – 25 July 1962) was a French racing cyclist. He rode in the 1920 Tour de France.
