= Camille Leroy =

Belgian cyclist

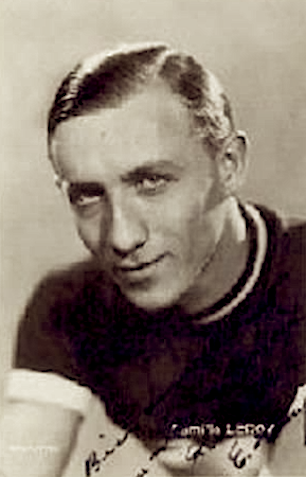

Personal information
- Born: 27 April 1892
- Died: 13 August 1952 (aged 60)

Cycling career
- Sport: Cycling
- Role: Rider

Camille Leroy (27 April 1892 – 13 August 1952) was a Belgian racing cyclist. He rode in the 1921 Tour de France.
