= Jean Belvaux =

Belgian cyclist (1894–1955)

Personal information
- Born: 8 December 1894
- Died: 12 March 1955 (aged 60)

Cycling career
- Sport: Cycling
- Role: Rider

Jean Belvaux (8 December 1894 – 12 March 1955) was a Belgian racing cyclist. He rode in the 1921 Tour de France.
