= Louis Heusghem =

Belgian cyclist

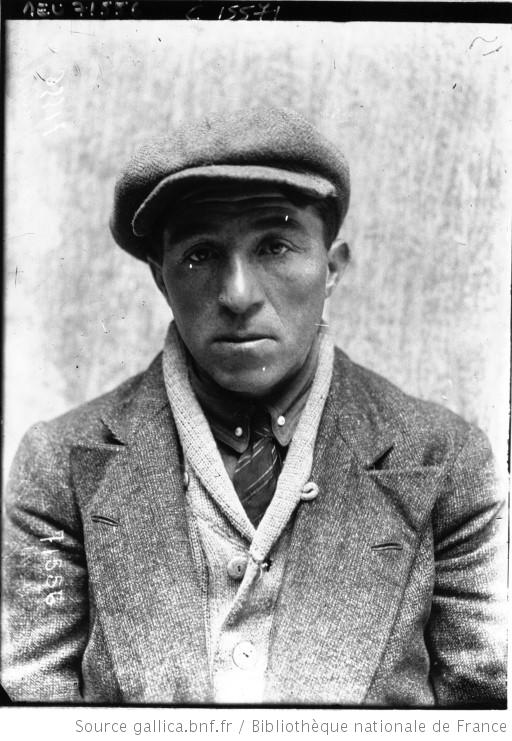

Personal information
- Full name: Louis Heusghem
- Born: 26 December 1882 Ransart, Belgium
- Died: 26 August 1939 (aged 56) Montignies-le-Tilleul, Belgium

Cycling career
- Sport: Cycling
- Discipline: Road
- Role: Rider

Major wins
- Paris–Tours (1912); One stage 1912 Tour de France

Louis Heusghem (26 December 1882 – 26 August 1939) was a Belgian professional road bicycle racer. He was the brother of cyclists Hector Heusghem and Pierre-Joseph Heusghem. His best Tour de France finish was his fifth place in 1911. In 1912, he won a stage in the Tour de France and Paris–Tours.

== Major results ==
1911
Tour de France:

5th place overall classification

1912
Paris–Tours
Tour de France:

Winner stage 12

1920
Tour de France:

Winner stage 8
