= Paul Coppens =

French cyclist

Personal information
- Born: 1 April 1888
- Died: 31 May 1946 (aged 58)

Cycling career
- Sport: Cycling
- Role: Rider

Paul Coppens (1 April 1888 – 31 May 1946) was a French racing cyclist. He rode in the 1921 Tour de France.
