= Pierre Hudsyn =

Belgian cyclist

Personal information
- Born: 14 September 1894
- Died: 26 December 1978 (aged 84)

Cycling career
- Sport: Cycling
- Role: Rider

Pierre Hudsyn (14 September 1894 – 26 December 1978) was a Belgian racing cyclist. He rode in the 1920 Tour de France.
