= Theodore Wynsdau =

Belgian cyclist

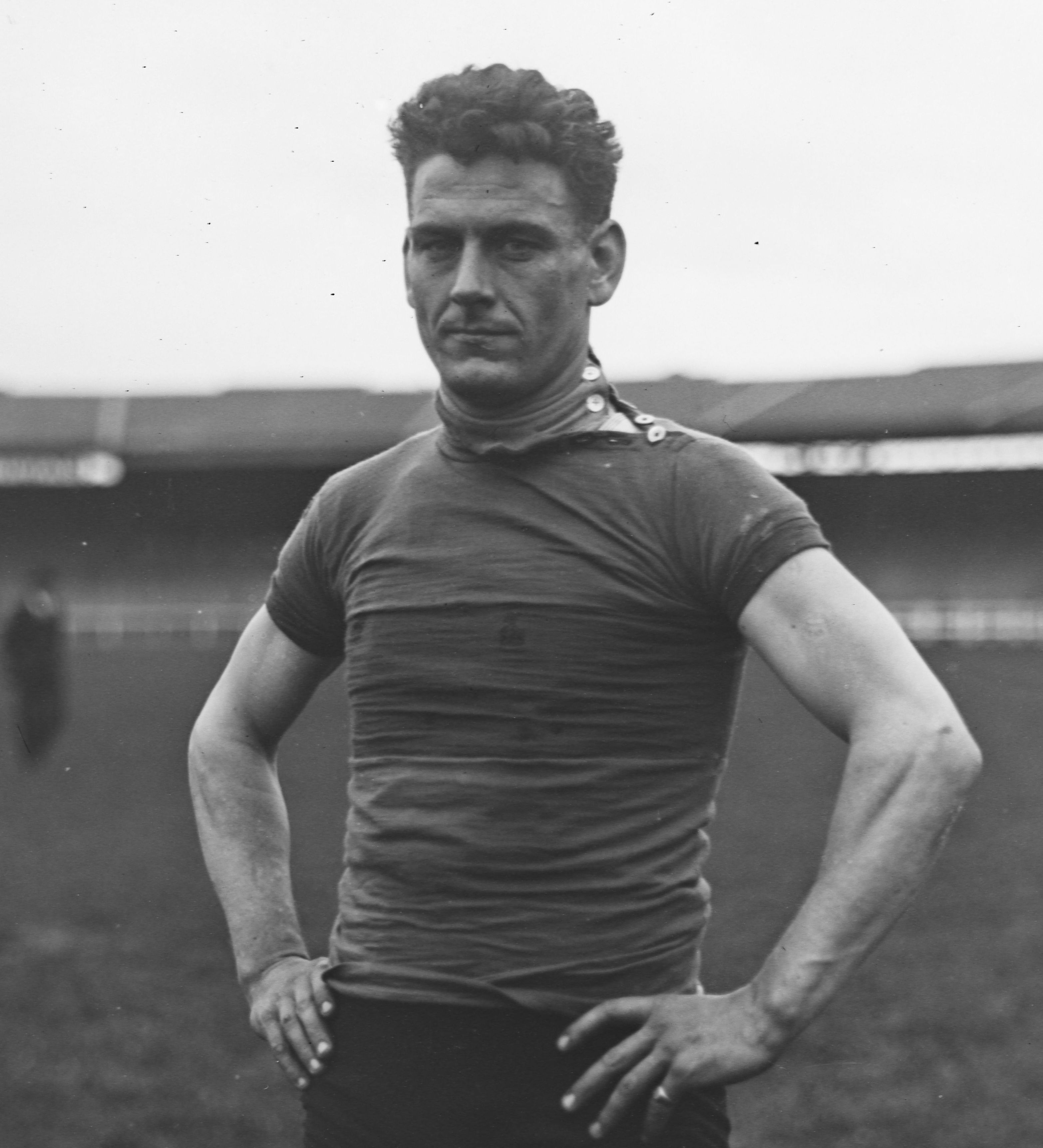

Personal information
- Born: 8 January 1895
- Died: 1 September 1951 (aged 56)

Cycling career
- Sport: Cycling
- Role: Rider

Theodore Wynsdau (8 January 1895 – 1 September 1951) was a Belgian racing cyclist. He rode in the 1920 Tour de France.
