= Victor Dethier =

Belgian cyclist (1892–1963)

Personal information
- Full name: Victor Dethier
- Born: 23 March 1892 Liège, Belgium
- Died: 23 April 1963 (aged 71) Liège, Belgium

Cycling career
- Sport: Cycling
- Role: Rider

Victor Dethier (23 March 1892 – 23 April 1963) was a Belgian racing cyclist. He won the Belgian national road race title in 1914.
