= Eugène Dhers =

French cyclist

Personal information
- Born: January 26, 1891 France
- Died: 11 December 1980 (aged 89)

Cycling career
- Sport: Cycling
- Discipline: Road
- Role: Rider

Professional teams
- 1912: Automoto - Persan
- 1914: J.B. Louvet
- 1919: J.B. Louvet
- 1920–1921: La Sportive
- 1923: Armor-Dunlop
- 1926: Météore-Wolber

Eugène Dhers (born 1891) was a French racing cyclist. He rode 11 Tours of France during his career, achieving his best result in 1923, where he placed 9th.

== Major results ==
1910
7th Paris–Tours
1911
3rd Milano-Modena
5th Paris–Brussels
10th Paris–Roubaix
1921
2nd Criterium des Aiglons
1922
8th Paris–Brussels
1923
9th Overall Tour de France
1924
7th Paris–Roubaix

=== Grand Tour general classification results timeline ===
Grand Tour	1912	1913	1914	1915	1916	1917	1918	1919	1920	1921	1922	1923	1924	1925	1926	1927
Giro d'Italia	Did not Race															
Tour de France	24	—	DNF	Not Held				DNF	11	12	DNF	9	23	23	29	DNF
Vuelta a España	Did not Exist															
