= Louis Mottiat =

Belgian cyclist

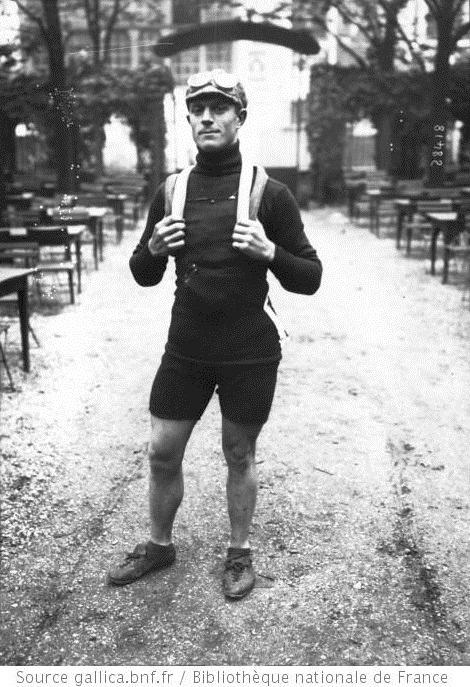

Personal information
- Full name: Louis Mottiat
- Nickname: De man van ijzer (The Iron Man)
- Born: 6 July 1889 Bouffioulx, Belgium
- Died: 5 June 1972 (aged 82) Gilly, Belgium

Cycling career
- Sport: Cycling
- Discipline: Road
- Role: Rider

Professional teams
- 1912–1913: Thomann
- 1913–1914: Alcyon
- 1919–1921: Alcyon-La Sportive
- 1922–1926: Alcyon-Dunlop

Major wins
- 8 stages Tour de France; Liège–Bastogne–Liège(2x); Tour of Belgium (2x)

Louis Mottiat (6 July 1889 – 5 June 1972) was a Belgian professional road bicycle racer. Mottiat was born in Bouffioulx, and because of his endurance was nicknamed 'the iron man'. His career was interrupted by World War I. He died in Gilly, aged 82.

== Major results ==
1910
Brussels-Paris
1911
Paris-Calais
1912
Tour de France: Winner stage 10
1913
Bordeaux–Paris
1914
Tour of Belgium, including 4 stages
Paris–Brussels
1920
Critérium des As (Bordeaux–Paris-Bordeaux)
Tour of Belgium, including 3 stages
Tour de France

Winner stage 1
Wearing yellow jersey for one day

1921
Liège–Bastogne–Liège
Tour de France:

11th place overall classification
Winner stages 1, 4, 5 and 7
Wearing yellow jersey for one day

Paris–Brest–Paris
1922
Engis
Gembloux
Liège–Bastogne–Liège
1924
Paris–Tours
Tour de France:

Winner stage 8

1925
Tour de France:

Winner stage 3
