= 1920 Tour de France =

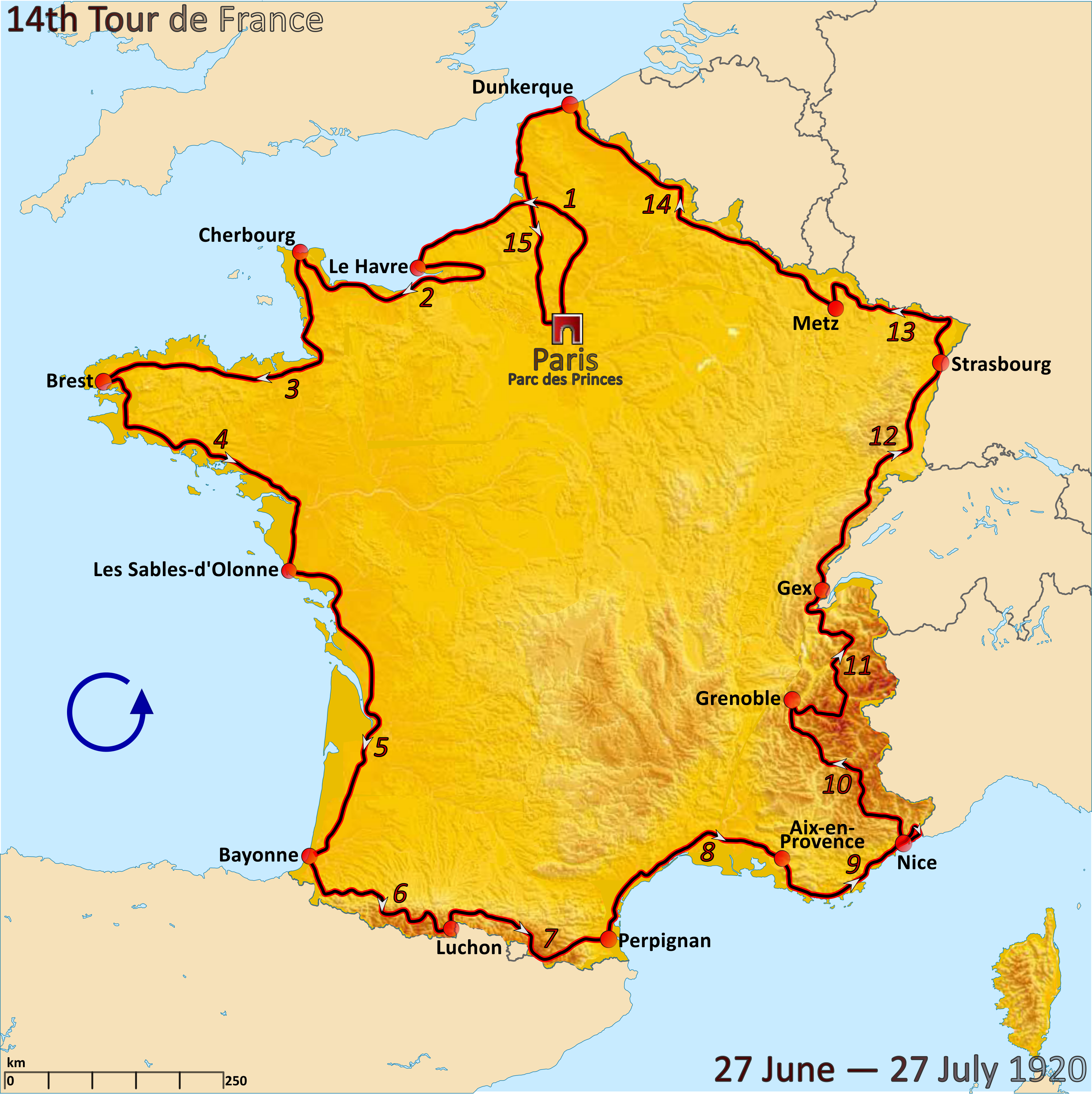
- Route of the 1920 Tour de France followed counterclockwise, starting in Paris

Race details
- Dates: 27 June – 27 July 1920
- Stages: 15
- Distance: 5,503 km (3,419 mi)
- Winning time: 228h 36' 13"

Results
Jersey awarded to the overall winner	Winner	Philippe Thys (BEL)	(1st class)
	Second	Hector Heusghem (BEL)	(1st class)
	Third	Firmin Lambot (BEL)	(1st class)

The 1920 Tour de France was the 14th edition of the Tour de France, taking place from 27 June to 27 July. It consisted of 15 stages over 5,503 kilometres (3,419 mi), ridden at an average speed of 24.072 kilometres per hour (14.958 mph). It was won by Belgian Philippe Thys, making him the first cyclist to win the Tour de France three times. The Belgians dominated this Tour: 12 of the 15 stages were won by Belgians, and the first eight cyclists in the final classification were Belgian.

== Innovations and changes ==
The 1919 Tour de France had been more difficult than before because of the influence of World War I on the roads and the cyclists, but in 1920, things were going back to normal, although the overall speed was only marginally higher than in 1919, the slowest Tour de France in history. In 1919 only 67 cyclists started the race, but in 1920 this had increased to 113. Although the war was over, the cycling companies were not yet able to sponsor the cyclists in the way they did before the war, so they again bundled their forces under the nickname La Sportive. The cyclists were divided in two categories, this time named 1ère classe (first class), the professionals, and 2ème classe (second class), the amateurs.

The 1920 Tour de France used the same formula as since 1910, that would also be used until 1924: fifteen stages, in total around 5000 km, around the perimeter of France, starting and finishing in Paris. In 1919, Philippe Thys had been in poor physical condition, and he did not even finish the first stage. He was ridiculed in the newspaper, and trained hard in the winter to be in better shape in 1920.

== Participants ==
There were 138 cyclists signed up for the race, of which 113 started the first stage. 31 of those were in the first class, the other 82 in the second class.

Favourites were Eugène Christophe, Louis Mottiat, Philippe Thys, Gaetano Belloni, Jean Alavoine and Henri Pélissier.

== Race overview ==
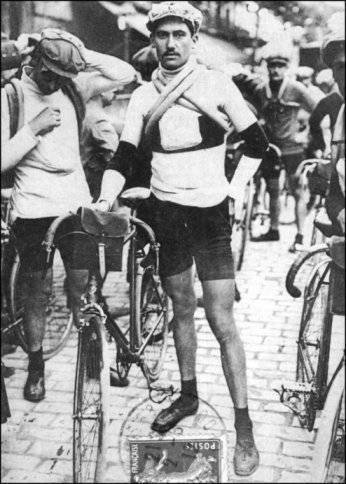
Henri Pélissier, who won the third and fourth stage of the 1920 Tour de France, quit the race in the fifth stage.

The 1920 Tour de France is described as a boring race. The weather was extremely hot, and after four stages already 65 of the 113 cyclists had quit. French favourites stopped the race early. Eugène Christophe in the 7th stage because of back pain, Jean Alavoine in the 2nd stage and Francis Pélissier in the 3rd stage. Henri Pélissier started well by winning the third stage and the fourth stage, and was the main threat for Philippe Thys who was leading the race. Then, in the 5th stage, Henri Pélissier was penalised with two minutes for throwing away a flat tyre illegally. Pélissier objected to the penalty, and immediately left the race. Henri Desgrange mentioned that Henri Pélissier was not tough enough, and would never win the Tour de France. He would later win the 1923 edition.

The first five stages finished in a group, and multiple cyclists were leading the race with the same aggregate time. In fact, twelve of the fifteen stages finished with a group. Tour organiser Henri Desgrange did not like this, as he wanted the cyclists to ride as individuals. Thys was leading the race after the fifth stage, in the same time as Émile Masson. In the sixth and seventh stage over the Pyrenees, Thys rode economically. He kept close to cyclists who could be a threat, but did not ride away. After those two stages, he led with almost half an hour before Hector Heusghem. The next stage he won, half an hour before Heusghem, so now his lead was one hour. Although Heusghem won stage nine, he did not win back any time on Thys who finished third in the same time. The yellow jersey had been introduced already in 1919, but in 1920 the organisation had not awarded the jersey in the first eight stages. After Thys was still leading in stage nine, he received the yellow jersey. Tour organiser Desgrange was so unhappy with the lack of battle in the race, that he wanted to stop the race after the tenth stage, but was convinced to let the race continue.

The Belgians had dominated the race. Honoré Barthélémy was the best French cyclist at the eighth place. He had many falls during the race, broke his wrist and dislocated his shoulder. Barthélémy turned his handlebars up, so he did not have to bend his back. When he reached Paris, the French crowd considered him a hero.

The race was won by Belgian Philippe Thys. Thys had been in every breakaway, finished in the top five in every stage, winning four stages and coming in second seven times.

== Results ==
In each stage, all cyclists started together. The cyclist who reached the finish first, was the winner of the stage. The time that each cyclist required to finish the stage was recorded. For the general classification, these times were added up; the cyclist with the least accumulated time was the race leader. From the ninth stage on, the leader in the general classification was identified by the yellow jersey.

=== Stage results ===
Stage characteristics and winners
Stage	Date	Course	Distance	Type (Note: In 1920, there was no distinction in the rules between plain stages and mountain stages; the icons shown here indicate which stages included mountains.)	Winner	Race leader
1	27 June	Paris to Le Havre	388 km (241 mi)	Plain stage	Louis Mottiat (BEL)	Louis Mottiat (BEL) (Note: After the first stage, Mottiat, Rossius, Thys, Goethals and Masson had the same time. Mottiat was ranked first because he had won the stage.)
2	29 June	Le Havre to Cherbourg-en-Cotentin	364 km (226 mi)	Plain stage	Philippe Thys (BEL)	Philippe Thys (BEL) (Note: After the second stage, Mottiat, Rossius, Thys, Goethals and Masson had the same time. In some rankings, they share the lead, in other rankings, Thys is leading because he had the best stage rankings.)
3	1 July	Cherbourg to Brest	405 km (252 mi)	Plain stage	Henri Pélissier (FRA)	Philippe Thys (BEL) (Note: After the third stage, Rossius, Thys, Goethals and Masson had the same time. In some rankings, they share the lead, in other rankings, Thys is leading because he had the best stage rankings.)
4	3 July	Brest to Les Sables d'Olonne	412 km (256 mi)	Plain stage	Henri Pélissier (FRA)	Philippe Thys (BEL) (Note: After the fourth and fifthstage, Thys and Masson had the same time. In some rankings, they share the lead, in other rankings, Thys is leading because he had the best stage rankings.)
5	5 July	Les Sables d'Olonne to Bayonne	482 km (300 mi)	Plain stage	Firmin Lambot (BEL)	Philippe Thys (BEL)
6	7 July	Bayonne to Luchon	326 km (203 mi)	Stage with mountain	Firmin Lambot (BEL)	Philippe Thys (BEL)
7	9 July	Luchon to Perpignan	323 km (201 mi)	Stage with mountain	Jean Rossius (BEL)	Philippe Thys (BEL)
8	11 July	Perpignan to Aix-en-Provence	325 km (202 mi)	Plain stage	Louis Heusghem (BEL)	Philippe Thys (BEL)
9	14 July	Aix-en-Provence to Nice	356 km (221 mi)	Stage with mountain	Philippe Thys (BEL)	Philippe Thys (BEL)
10	16 July	Nice to Grenoble	333 km (207 mi)	Stage with mountain	Hector Heusghem (BEL)	Philippe Thys (BEL)
11	18 July	Grenoble to Gex	362 km (225 mi)	Stage with mountain	Léon Scieur (BEL)	Philippe Thys (BEL)
12	20 July	Gex to Strasbourg	354 km (220 mi)	Plain stage	Philippe Thys (BEL)	Philippe Thys (BEL)
13	22 July	Strasbourg to Metz	300 km (190 mi)	Plain stage	Philippe Thys (BEL)	Philippe Thys (BEL)
14	24 July	Metz to Dunkerque	433 km (269 mi)	Plain stage	Félix Goethals (FRA)	Philippe Thys (BEL)
15	27 July	Dunkerque to Paris	340 km (210 mi)	Plain stage	Jean Rossius (BEL)	Philippe Thys (BEL)
	Total		5,503 km (3,419 mi)			

=== General classification ===
The final general classification, calculated by adding the stages times, was won by Philippe Thys.

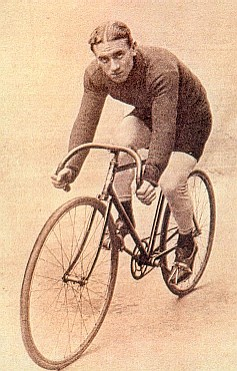
Philippe Thys, the winner of the 1920 Tour de France.

Final general classification (1–10)
Rank	Rider	Class	Time
1	Philippe Thys (BEL)	1	228h 36' 13"
2	Hector Heusghem (BEL)	1	+ 57' 21"
3	Firmin Lambot (BEL)	1	+ 1h 39' 35"
4	Leon Scieur (BEL)	1	+ 1h 44' 58"
5	Émile Masson (BEL)	1	+ 2h 56' 52"
6	Louis Heusghem (BEL)	1	+ 3h 40' 47"
7	Jean Rossius (BEL)	1	+ 3h 49' 55"
8	Honore Barthelemy (FRA)	1	+ 5h 35' 19"
9	Félix Goethals (FRA)	1	+ 9h 23' 07"
10	Joseph Vandaele (BEL)	1	+ 10h 45' 41"

Final general classification (11–22)
Rank	Rider	Class	Time
11	Eugène Dhers (FRA)	1	+ 11h 15' 09"
12	Joseph Pelletier (FRA)	2	+ 20h 04' 32"
13	Théo Wynsdau (BEL)	2	+ 25h 14' 02"
14	Noel Amenc (FRA)	2	+ 33h 25' 47"
15	Joseph Muller (FRA)	2	+ 33h 48' 53"
16	Henri Ferrera (FRA)	2	+ 34h 32' 27"
17	Guglielmo Ceccherelli (ITA)	2	+ 48h 40' 35"
18	Marius Matheron (FRA)	2	+ 51h 11' 04"
19	Etienne Dorfeuille (FRA)	2	+ 53h 10' 00"
20	Pierre Hudsyn (BEL)	2	+ 55h 36' 42"
21	André Coutte (FRA)	2	+ 55h 57' 46"
22	Charles Raboisson (FRA)	2	+ 69h 00' 05"

== Bibliography ==
- Augendre, Jacques (2016). "Guide historique" [Historical guide] (PDF). Tour de France (in French). Paris: Amaury Sport Organisation. Archived (PDF) from the original on 17 August 2016.
- McGann, Bill; McGann, Carol (2006). The Story of the Tour de France: 1903–1964. Vol. 1. Indianapolis: Dog Ear Publishing. ISBN 978-1-59858-180-5.
- Thompson, Christopher S. (2008). The Tour de France: A Cultural History. Oakland, California: University of California Press. ISBN 978-0-520-25630-9.
