= Hector Heusghem =

Belgian cyclist

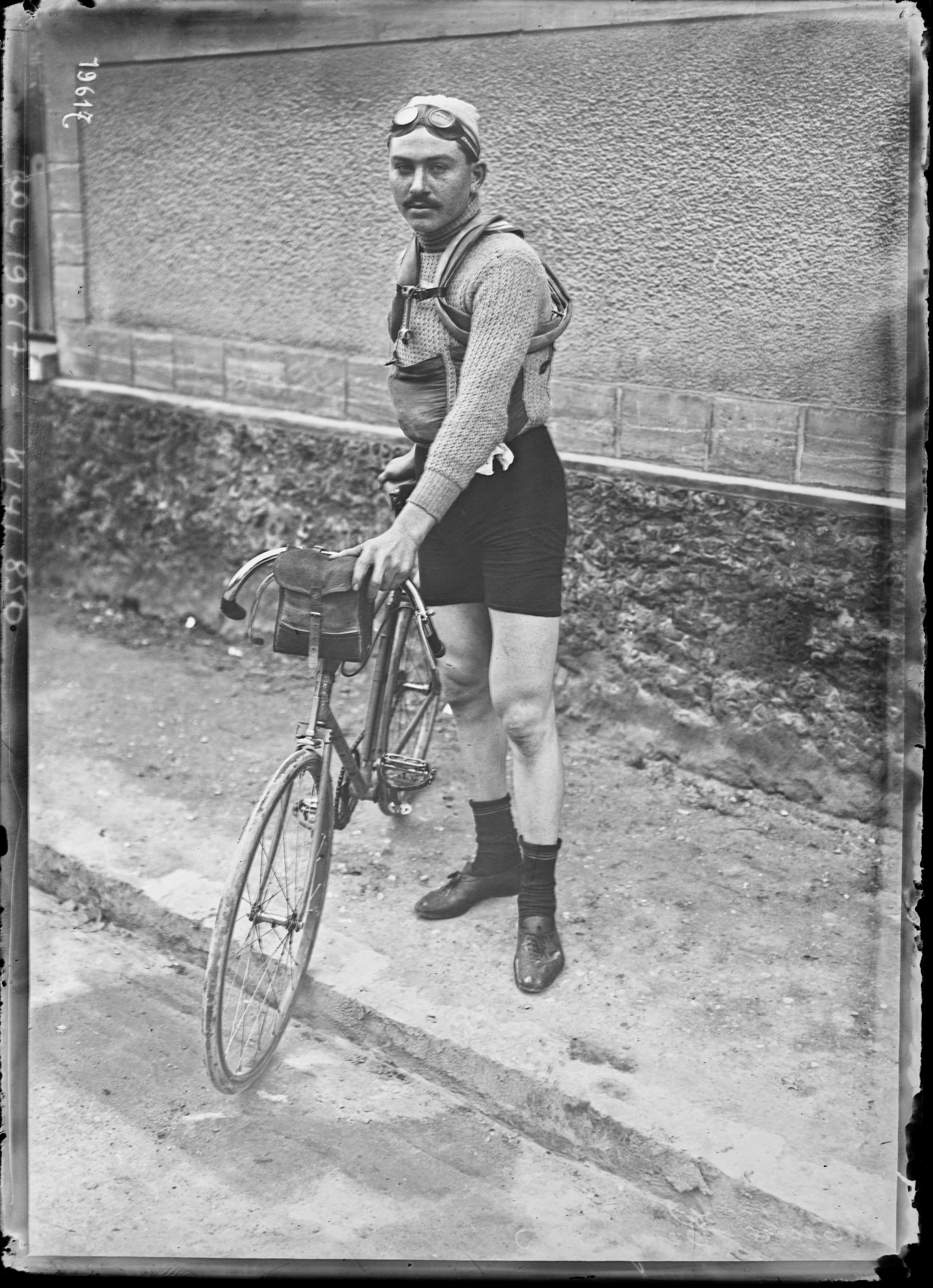

Personal information
- Full name: Hector Heusghem
- Born: 15 February 1890 Ransart, Belgium
- Died: 29 March 1982 (aged 92) Montigny-le-Tilleul, Belgium

Cycling career
- Sport: Cycling
- Discipline: Road
- Role: Rider

Major wins
- Grand Tours Tour de France 3 individual stages (1920, 1921)

Hector Heusghem (Ransart, 15 February 1890 – Montignies-le-Tilleul, 29 March 1982) was a Belgian cyclist who finished second in the 1920 and 1921 Tour de France. He also won three stages, in 1920 at Aix-en-Provence and Grenoble, in 1921 in Luchon.

In 1922, Heusghem took over the yellow jersey with just three stages to go but on the next day fell foul of the rules. Having broken his frame, he swapped bicycles without permission and received a one-hour penalty that relegated him to fourth and handing the tour to Firmin Lambot.

Hector Heusghem was brother of cyclists Pierre-Joseph Heusghem and Louis Heusghem.

== Major results ==
1920
Tour de France:

Winner stages 8 and 10
2nd place overall classification

1921
Tour de France:

Winner stage 6
2nd place overall classification

1922
Tour de France:

4th place overall classification
Wearing yellow jersey for one day
