= Henri Ferrara =

French cyclist

Personal information
- Born: 31 October 1889
- Died: 12 December 1973 (aged 84)

Cycling career
- Sport: Cycling
- Role: Rider

Henri Ferrara (31 October 1889 – 12 December 1973) was a French racing cyclist. He rode in the 1920 Tour de France.
