= Noël Amenc =

French cyclist

Personal information
- Born: 25 December 1889 Malijai, France
- Died: 13 March 1955 (aged 65) Nice, France

Cycling career
- Sport: Cycling
- Role: Rider

Noël Amenc (25 December 1889 – 13 March 1955) was a French racing cyclist. He rode in the 1920 Tour de France.
