= Félix Goethals =

French cyclist (1891–1962)

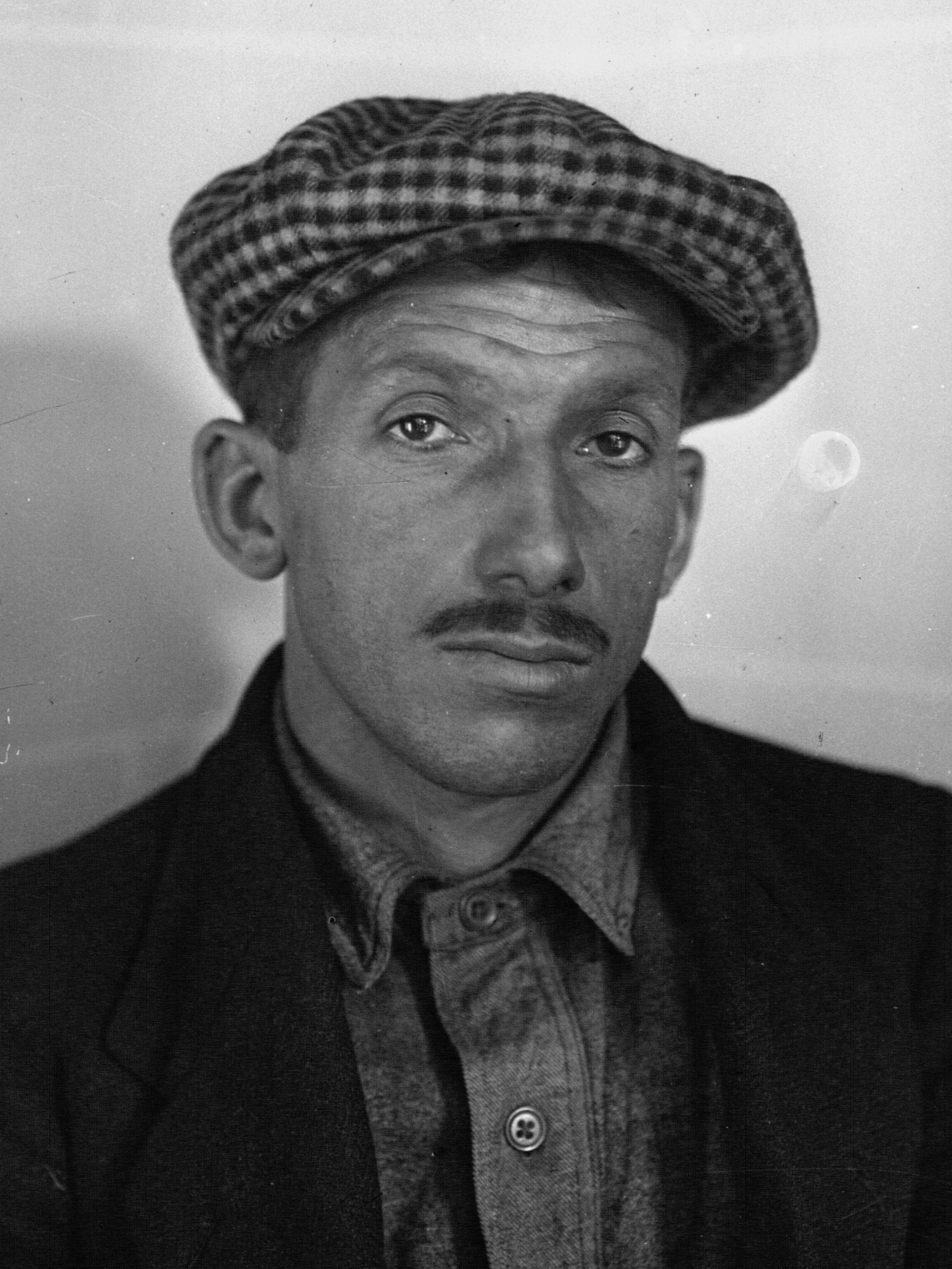

Personal information
- Full name: Félix Goethals
- Born: 14 January 1891 Rinxent, France
- Died: 24 September 1962 (aged 71) Capinghem, France

Cycling career
- Sport: Cycling
- Discipline: Road
- Role: Rider

Major wins
- 7 stages Tour de France

Félix Goethals (14 January 1891 in Rinxent – 24 September 1962 in Capinghem) was a French professional road bicycle racer, who won seven stages in total in the Tour de France. His best final classification was a ninth place in 1920.

== Major results ==
1913
Circuit de Champagne
1914
Circuit de Calais
1920
Tour de France:

Winner stage 14

1921
París-Bourganeuf
Tour de France:

Winner stages 11, 14 and 15

1923
Tour de France:

Winner stages 14 and 15

1924
Tour de France:

Winner stage 4

1925
Paris-Calais
