= Ransart, Belgium =

Ransart El Ronsåt (Walloon)
- Former municipality of Belgium
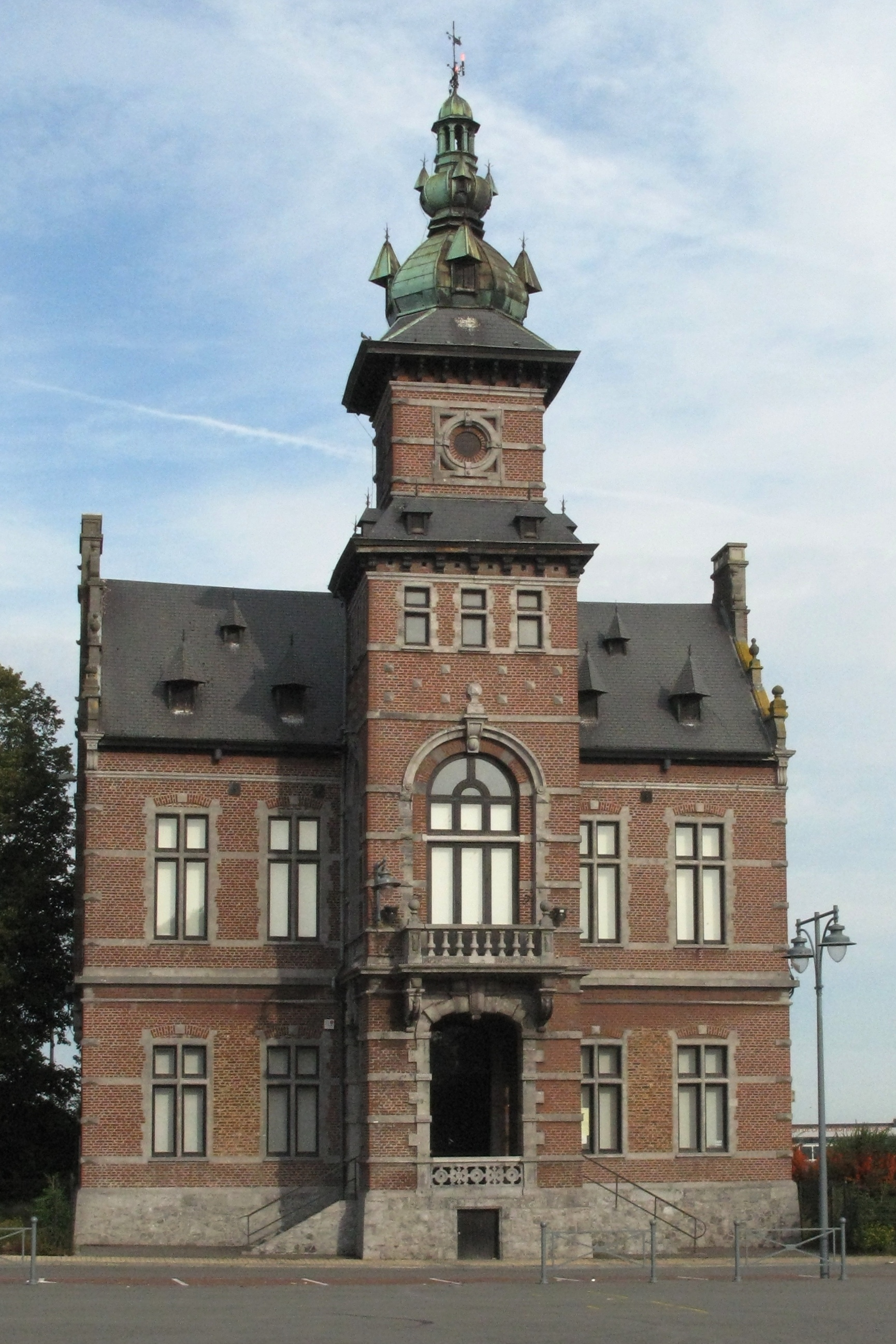
- Former town hall of Ransart

- Location in the municipality of Charleroi

- Location in Belgium
- Coordinates: 50°27′N 4°28′E
- Country: Belgium
- Region: Wallonia
- Community: French Community
- Province: Hainaut
- Municipality: Charleroi

Area
  - Total: 2.19 sq mi (5.68 km^{2})

Population (2001)
  - Total: 8,498
- Time zone: UTC+1 (CET)
  - Summer (DST): UTC+2 (CEST)
- Postal code: 6043
- Area code: 071

Ransart (French pronunciation: [ʁɑ̃saʁ]; Walloon: El Ronsåt) is a town of Wallonia and district of the municipality of Charleroi, located in the province of Hainaut, Belgium.

It was a municipality of its own before the merger of the municipalities in 1977.
