= Émile Masson (cyclist) =

Belgian cyclist

Emile Masson
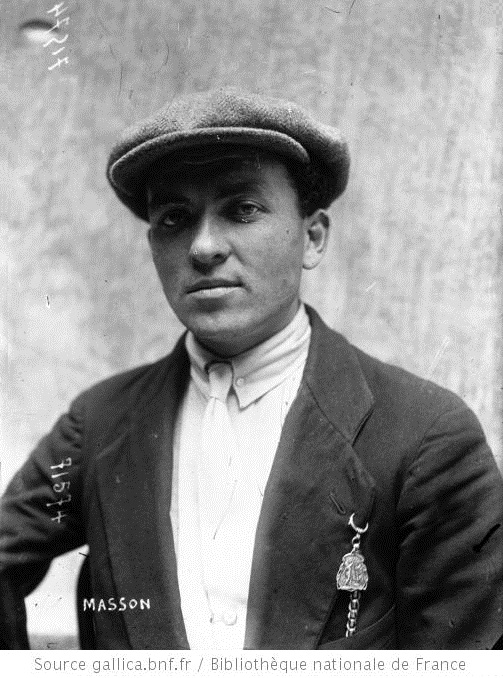
- Masson in 1919

Personal information
- Full name: Emile Masson
- Born: 16 October 1888 Morialmé, Belgium
- Died: 25 October 1973 (aged 85) Bierset, Belgium

Cycling career
- Sport: Cycling
- Discipline: Road
- Role: Rider

Major wins
- Tour of Belgium (1919, 1923); Bordeaux–Paris (1923); 2 stages 1922 Tour de France

Emile Masson (Morialmé, 16 October 1888 — Bierset, 25 October 1973) was a Belgian professional road bicycle racer. Masson won two stages in the 1922 Tour de France. His son, Émile Masson Jr., also became a successful cyclist.

== Major results ==
1919
Tour of Belgium
1922
1922 Tour de France:

Winner stages 11 and 12

1923
Bordeaux–Paris
Tour of Belgium
Sclessin – St. Hubert – Sclessin
GP Wolber
1924
Jemeppe – Bastogne – Jemeppe
Paris-Lyon
