= Honoré Barthélémy =

French cyclist (1891–1964)

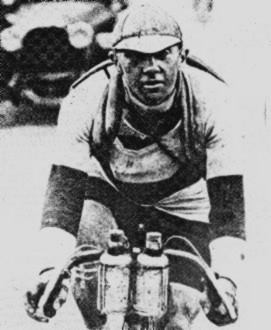
- Honoré Barthélémy

Personal information
- Full name: Honoré Barthélémy
- Born: September 25, 1891 Paris, France
- Died: May 12, 1964 (aged 72) Paris, France

Cycling career
- Sport: Cycling
- Disciplines: Road and track
- Role: Rider

Professional teams
- 1914-1918: Not recorded
- 1919-1921: La Sportive
- 1922-1924: Automoto
- 1925: Météore-Wolber
- 1926: Automoto-Hutchinson
- 1927: Dilecta-Wolber

Major wins
- 1919 & 1921 5 stages, Tour de France; 1925 & 1927 Bol D'Or

Honoré Barthélémy (25 September 1891 – 12 May 1964) was a French road bicycle racer who took part and finished fifth overall and won four stages in the 1919 Tour de France. He was born in Paris, France.

In 1920, says the Yellow Jersey Guide to the Tour de France, he crashed on the stage to Aix-en-Provence and only slowly got back on his bike, dazed and bloody. He could not bend his back and had to turn his handlebars upside down to be able to continue. As his dizziness lessened, he realised that what he thought was concussion was blindness. A flint had gone into an eye.

Despite that, he finished not only that day but the Tour, coming eighth despite half-blindness, a broken shoulder and a dislocated wrist. He was carried in triumph at the finish. Nor did he stop racing when he was fitted with a glass eye. Dusty roads made it uncomfortable and he often took it out. The socket would then become infected and he would plug it with cotton.

"It makes no difference to my sight but it's more comfortable," he said. The glass eye often fell out and in 1924 he had to get down on his knees on the finish line to see where it had gone. He grumbled that he spent more on replacement eyes than he earned in prizes.

At the 1921 Tour de France, he finished third overall and won stage 12. He last rode the Tour de France in 1927, abandoning on stage 9.

He twice won the marathon Bol d'Or track race in 1925 and 1927.

== Major results ==
1919
3rd, Paris–Roubaix
5th, Overall, Tour de France

1st, Stage 6
1st, Stage 9
1st, Stage 10
1st, Stage 11

1920
2nd, Paris–Tours
8th, Overall, Tour de France
1921
1st Paris-St Etienne
1st, Stage 2
3rd, Overall, Tour de France

1st, Stage 12

1924
2 stage wins Tour du Sud-Est
1925
1st Bol d'Or
1927
1st Bol d'Or
