= Firmin Lambot =

Belgian cyclist

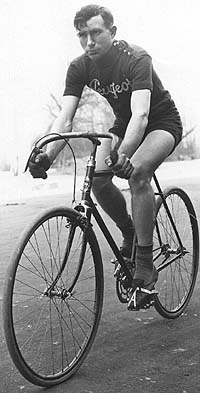
- Firmin Lambot, c. 1920

Personal information
- Full name: Firmin Lambot
- Nickname: L'Homme de Florennes (The Man from Florennes)
- Born: 14 March 1886 Florennes, Belgium
- Died: 19 January 1964 (aged 77) Borgerhout, Belgium

Cycling career
- Sport: Cycling
- Discipline: Road
- Role: Rider

Major wins
- Grand Tours Tour de France General classification (1919, 1922) Mountains classification (1914, 1920) 6 individual stages (1913, 1914, 1919-1921) One-day races and Classics National Interclubs Championships (1919)

Firmin Lambot (pronounced [fiʁ.mɛ̃ lɑ̃.bo]; 14 March 1886 – 19 January 1964) was a Belgian bicycle racer who twice won the Tour de France.

Born in the small town of Florennes, Lambot worked as a saddler. He worked 12 hours a day, starting at 6am. He bought his first bicycle at 17 and began riding 50 km a day to and from work. His first race was in a local village; he won five francs as first prize. He then bought a racing bike.

He began racing professionally in 1908. In that year he won the championships of Flanders and Belgium. He rode the Tour de France from 1911 to 1913 but the First World War ended the race for the next five years.

When the Tour returned in 1919, it was a miserable affair of war-torn roads, fractured logistics and former contenders no longer alive to compete. Only 11 riders finished. Lambot was approached at the Buffalo track in Paris, where he had ridden a 24-hour race, to ride the Tour in the Globe Cycles team. He was second for much of the race but took the lead when Eugène Christophe broke a fork. Observers felt Lambot owed his victory more to Christophe's bad luck than his own ability and a collection for Christophe surpassed the prize money Lambot received. His performance brought him a contract from the larger Peugeot team at 300 francs a month. He was engaged to ride just the Tour de France.

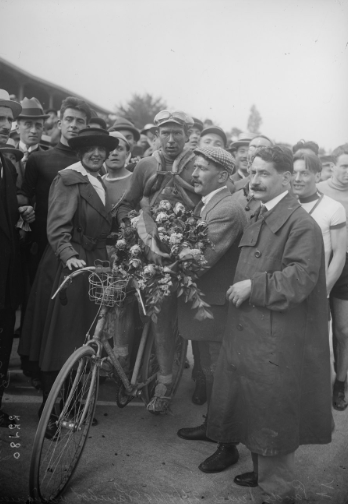
Lambot in the Parc des Princes, after winning the 1919 Tour de France

In the 1920 and 1921 Tours, Lambot placed respectably and in 1922 he won for the second time after Hector Heusghem was handed a one hour penalty for swapping his bicycle after breaking the frame. He became the first to win the Tour without winning a stage. Lambot was 36 when he won the 1922 Tour, the oldest winner of one of cycling's grand tours at that time. He kept the record for over 90 years, until it was broken by 41-year-old Vuelta winner Chris Horner in 2013. He remains the oldest Tour winner to date.

By the end of his career he was paid 1 800 francs a month by his team. In retirement, he returned to work as a saddler.

== Career achievements ==
=== Major results ===
1908
1st Andenne
1st Fosses-la-Ville
1st Genappe
1st Mazy
1st Velaine-sur-Sambre
2nd Kampioenschap van Vlaanderen
2nd Charleroi-Beaumont-Charleroi
1909
4th National Road Race Championships
1910
9th Overall Tour of Belgium
1911
8th National Road Race Championships
1912
5th National Road Race Championships
1913
4th Overall Tour de France

Winner stage 9

1914
8th Overall Tour de France

Winner stage 7

1919
1st Overall Tour de France

Winner stage 14

1920
3rd Overall Tour de France

Winner stages 5 and 6

5th Liège–Bastogne–Liège
8th Paris–Brussels
1921
9th Overall Tour de France:

Winner stage 9

1922
1st Overall Tour de France
3rd Paris–Lyon
3rd Giro della Provincia Milano (fr)

=== Grand Tour results timeline ===
	1911	1912	1913	1914	1915	1916	1917	1918	1919	1920	1921	1922	1923	1924
Giro d'Italia	DNE	DNE	DNE	DNE	N/A	N/A	N/A	N/A	DNE	DNE	DNE	DNE	DNE	DNE
Stages won	—	—	—	—	N/A	N/A	N/A	N/A	—	—	—	—	—	—
Tour de France	11	18	4	8	N/A	N/A	N/A	N/A	1	3	9	1	DNF-6	DNF-8
Stages won	0	0	1	1	N/A	N/A	N/A	N/A	1	2	1	0	0	0
Vuelta a España	N/A	N/A	N/A	N/A	N/A	N/A	N/A	N/A	N/A	N/A	N/A	N/A	N/A	N/A
Stages won	N/A	N/A	N/A	N/A	N/A	N/A	N/A	N/A	N/A	N/A	N/A	N/A	N/A	N/A

Legend
1	Winner
2–3	Top three-finish
4–10	Top ten-finish
11–	Other finish
DNE	Did not enter
DNF-x	Did not finish (retired on stage x)
DNS-x	Did not start (not started on stage x)
HD-x	Finished outside time limit (occurred on stage x)
DSQ	Disqualified
N/A	Race/classification not held
NR	Not ranked in this classification
