= List of teams and cyclists in the 1925 Tour de France =

List of cyclists

The participants of the 1925 Tour de France were divided into two groups: 39 cyclists were riding in sponsored teams, and 91 rode as touriste-routiers. The teams did not have equal size; the largest team, J.B. Louvet, consisted of eight cyclists, while the smallest team, J.Alavoine-Dunlop, had only one cyclist, Jean Alavoine himself. There were 57 French, 34 Belgian, 28 Italian, 5 Swiss, 5 Luxembourgian and 1 Spanish cyclists.

== Cyclists ==
=== By starting number ===
Legend
No.	Starting number worn by the rider during the Tour
Pos.	Position in the general classification
DNF	Denotes a rider who did not finish

No.	Name	Nationality	Team	Pos.	Ref
1	Ottavio Bottecchia	Italy	Automoto-Hutchinson	1	
2	Philippe Thys	Belgium	Automoto-Hutchinson	DNF	
3	Lucien Buysse	Belgium	Automoto-Hutchinson	2	
4	Jules Buysse	Belgium	Automoto-Hutchinson	15	
5	Henri Pélissier	France	Automoto-Hutchinson	DNF	
6	Francis Pélissier	France	Automoto-Hutchinson	DNF	
7	Eugène Christophe	France	JB Louvet-Pouchois	18	
8	Hector Martin	Belgium	JB Louvet-Pouchois	14	
9	Marcel Colleu	France	JB Louvet-Pouchois	DNF	
10	August Mortelmans	Belgium	JB Louvet-Pouchois	DNF	
11	Théo Wynsdau	Belgium	JB Louvet-Pouchois	DNF	
12	Raymond Decorte	Belgium	JB Louvet-Pouchois	DNF	
13	Camille Van De Casteele	Belgium	JB Louvet-Pouchois	DNF	
14	Albert Dejonghe	Belgium	JB Louvet-Pouchois	5	
15	Félix Sellier	Belgium	Alcyon-Dunlop	9	
16	Bartolomeo Aimo	Italy	Alcyon-Dunlop	3	
17	Louis Mottiat	Belgium	Alcyon-Dunlop	31	
18	Émile Masson	Belgium	Alcyon-Dunlop	22	
19	Romain Bellenger	France	Alcyon-Dunlop	11	
20	Nicolas Frantz	Luxembourg	Alcyon-Dunlop	4	
21	Raymond Englebert	Belgium	Labor-Dunlop	20	
22	Alfons Standaert	Belgium	Labor-Dunlop	35	
23	Théophile Beeckman	Belgium	Thomann-Dunlop	6	
24	Adelin Benoît	Belgium	Thomann-Dunlop	12	
25	Angelo Gremo	Italy	Meteore-Wolber	26	
26	Federico Gay	Italy	Meteore-Wolber	10	
28	Arturo Bresciani	Italy	Meteore-Wolber	28	
29	Luigi Lucotti	Italy	Meteore-Wolber	DNF	
30	Roger Lacolle	France	Meteore-Wolber	42	
31	Romolo Lazzaretti	Italy	Meteore-Wolber	DNF	
33	Auguste Verdyck	Belgium	Christophe Hutchinson	8	
34	Alfonso Piccin	Italy	Christophe Hutchinson	25	
35	Emile Hardy	Belgium	Christophe Hutchinson	17	
36	Omer Huyse	Belgium	Armor-Dunlop	7	
37	Giuseppe Enrici	Italy	Armor-Dunlop	DNF	
38	Jean Alavoine	France	J Alavoine-Dunlop	13	
39	Robert Jacquinot	France	Jean Louvet-Hutchinson	DNF	
40	Hector Heusghem	Belgium	Jean Louvet-Hutchinson	DNF	
41	Henri Collé	Switzerland	Jean Louvet-Hutchinson	DNF	
101	Daniel Masson	France	Touriste-routier	DNF	
102	Urbain Comitis	France	Touriste-routier	DNF	
103	Emile Costard	France	Touriste-routier	DNF	
104	Jean Majérus	Luxembourg	Touriste-routier	DNF	
105	François Chevalier	France	Touriste-routier	48	
107	Léopold Gelot	France	Touriste-routier	DNF	
108	Marcel Perrière	Switzerland	Touriste-routier	DNF	
109	Victor Guichon	France	Touriste-routier	DNF	
110	Charles Roux	France	Touriste-routier	34	
111	François Lepenant	France	Touriste-routier	DNF	
112	Antoine Rière	France	Touriste-routier	38	
113	Auguste Lesigne	France	Touriste-routier	DNF	
114	Marcel Guignebourg	France	Touriste-routier	DNF	
115	Gaston Morlet	France	Touriste-routier	DNF	
116	Alfred Francini	Italy	Touriste-routier	DNF	
117	René Wendels	Belgium	Touriste-routier	DNF	
118	Emile Broussard	France	Touriste-routier	DNF	
119	Pierre Argeles	France	Touriste-routier	DNF	
120	Charles Loew	France	Touriste-routier	37	
121	Joseph Pe	Belgium	Touriste-routier	DNF	
122	Camille Botte	Belgium	Touriste-routier	DNF	
123	Robert Beaulieu	France	Touriste-routier	DNF	
124	Alfons Van Daele	Belgium	Touriste-routier	DNF	
125	Charles Cento	Italy	Touriste-routier	41	
126	Giovanni Canova	Italy	Touriste-routier	27	
127	Henri Catelan	France	Touriste-routier	DNF	
129	Charles Martinet	Switzerland	Touriste-routier	29	
130	Maurice Protin	Belgium	Touriste-routier	DNF	
131	Louis Richert	France	Touriste-routier	DNF	
132	Albert Eischen	Luxembourg	Touriste-routier	DNF	
133	Henri Miège	France	Touriste-routier	44	
134	Henri Rubert	France	Touriste-routier	39	
135	Mose Arosio	Italy	Touriste-routier	32	
136	Edouard Teisseire	France	Touriste-routier	43	
137	Marcel Clausse	Belgium	Touriste-routier	DNF	
138	Charles Krier	Luxembourg	Touriste-routier	40	
139	Alexandre Bontoux	France	Touriste-routier	DNF	
140	Eugène Dhers	France	Touriste-routier	23	
141	Julien Lamby	France	Touriste-routier	DNF	
142	Arthur Hendryckx	Belgium	Touriste-routier	47	
143	Fernand Besnier	France	Touriste-routier	49	
144	Angelo Erba	Italy	Touriste-routier	DNF	
145	Adrien Toussaint	France	Touriste-routier	DNF	
146	Georges Lethor	France	Touriste-routier	DNF	
148	Lucien Prudhomme	France	Touriste-routier	46	
149	Albert Jordens	Belgium	Touriste-routier	DNF	
151	André Drobecq	France	Touriste-routier	DNF	
152	Joseph Berio	France	Touriste-routier	DNF	
153	Jules Deloffre	France	Touriste-routier	DNF	
154	Honoré Barthélémy	France	Touriste-routier	DNF	
155	Adrien Alpini	France	Touriste-routier	DNF	
156	Simeon Vergnol	France	Touriste-routier	DNF	
157	Giuseppe Ruffoni	Italy	Touriste-routier	DNF	
158	Julien Perdaens	Belgium	Touriste-routier	DNF	
159	Francesco Liverani	Italy	Touriste-routier	DNF	
161	Henri Touzard	France	Touriste-routier	24	
162	Alfred Steux	Belgium	Touriste-routier	DNF	
163	Maxime Mourguiat	France	Touriste-routier	DNF	
164	Auguste Pescher	France	Touriste-routier	DNF	
165	Maurice Arnoult	France	Touriste-routier	30	
166	Louis Lemitere	France	Touriste-routier	DNF	
168	Joseph Cassini	Italy	Touriste-routier	DNF	
169	Théo Bertholet	Switzerland	Touriste-routier	DNF	
170	Gaston Leme	France	Touriste-routier	DNF	
171	Victorin Leroy	France	Touriste-routier	DNF	
173	Victor Lafosse	France	Touriste-routier	DNF	
175	Robert Asse	France	Touriste-routier	DNF	
177	Joseph Rayen	France	Touriste-routier	DNF	
178	Désiderio Vinuesa	Spain	Touriste-routier	DNF	
180	Ricardo Benasseni	Italy	Touriste-routier	DNF	
181	Edouard Petre	France	Touriste-routier	45	
183	Charles Parel	Switzerland	Touriste-routier	DNF	
184	Guido Messeri	Italy	Touriste-routier	DNF	
185	Gaston Coriol	France	Touriste-routier	DNF	
187	Léon Avrillaud	France	Touriste-routier	DNF	
188	Victor Kirchen	Luxembourg	Touriste-routier	DNF	
189	Luigi Vertemati	Italy	Touriste-routier	DNF	
190	Felice Di Gaetano	Italy	Touriste-routier	DNF	
191	Giuseppe Borghi	Italy	Touriste-routier	DNF	
192	Arthur Targez	Belgium	Touriste-routier	DNF	
193	Umberto Berni	Italy	Touriste-routier	33	
195	Léon Despontin	Belgium	Touriste-routier	16	
196	Joseph Marchand	Belgium	Touriste-routier	DNF	
200	Jacques Coomans	Belgium	Touriste-routier	DNF	
201	Vincenzo Bianco	Italy	Touriste-routier	36	
202	Pietro Barrati	Italy	Touriste-routier	DNF	
205	Giovanni-Michele Gordini	Italy	Touriste-routier	21	
206	Alexandre Tozzi	France	Touriste-routier	DNF	
207	Eugene Chiaberge	France	Touriste-routier	DNF	
208	Giovanni Rossignoli	Italy	Touriste-routier	19	
209	Alfredo Comminetti	Italy	Touriste-routier	DNF	
