= 1925 Tour de France, Stage 1 to Stage 9 =

Cycling race stages

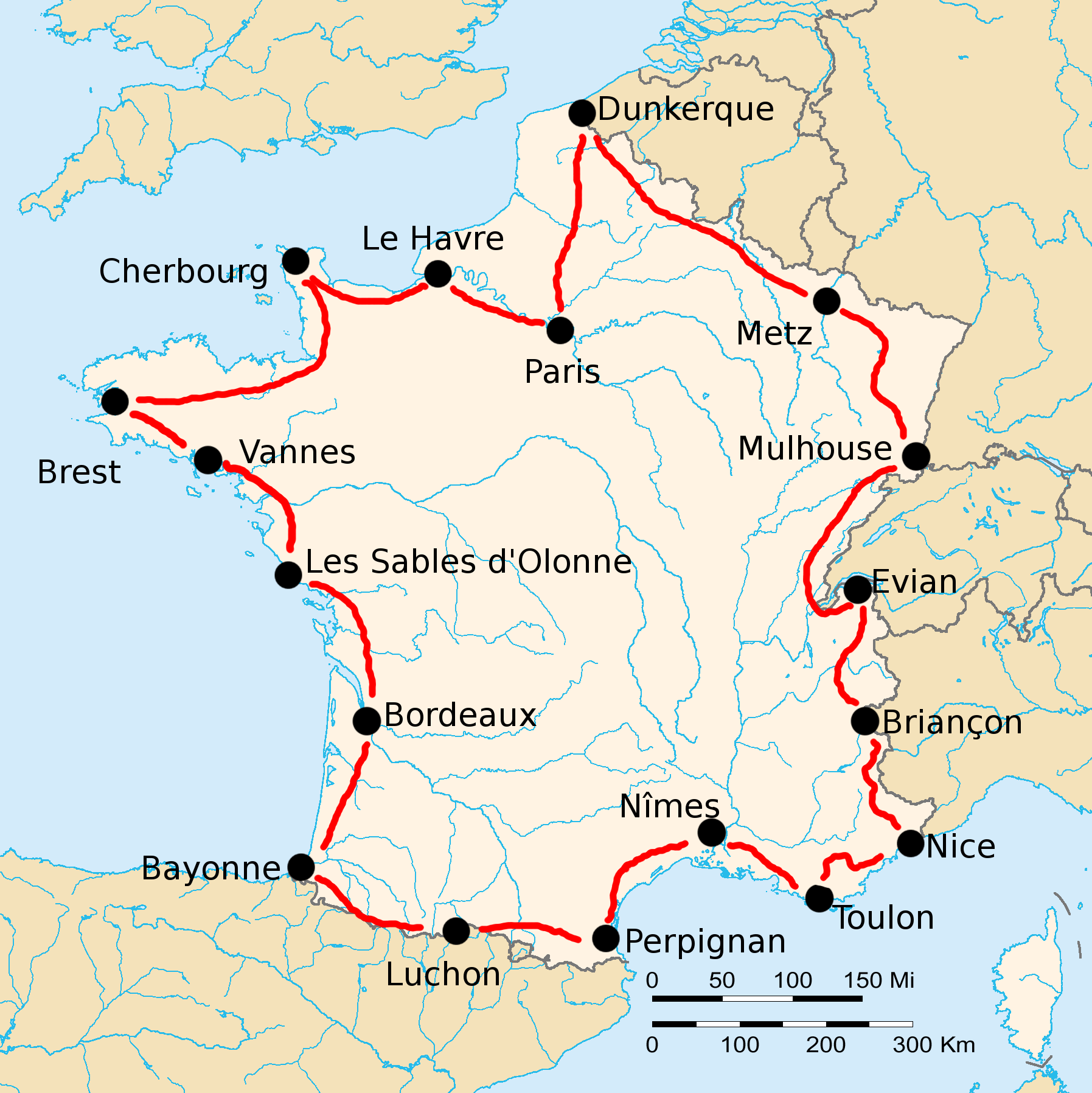
Route of the 1925 Tour de France

The 1925 Tour de France was the 19th edition of Tour de France, one of cycling's Grand Tours. The Tour began in Paris with a flat stage on 21 June, and Stage 9 occurred on 3 July with a mountainous stage to Perpignan. The race finished in Paris on 19 July.

== Stage 1 ==
21 June 1925 — Paris to Le Havre, 340 km (210 mi)

Stage 1 result and general classification after stage 1

| Rank | Rider | Team | Time |
|---|---|---|---|
| 1 | Ottavio Bottecchia (ITA) | Automoto-Hutchinson | 12h 19' 02" |
| 2 | Francis Pélissier (FRA) | Automoto-Hutchinson | + 2' 59" |
| 3 | Adelin Benoît (BEL) | Thomann-Dunlop | + 5' 59" |
| 4 | Félix Sellier (BEL) | Alcyon-Dunlop | s.t. |
| 5 | Auguste Verdyck (BEL) | Christophe Hutchinson | s.t. |
| 6 | Théophile Beeckman (BEL) | Thomann-Dunlop | s.t. |
| 7 | Arthur Targez (FRA) | Touriste-routier | s.t. |
| 8 | Nicolas Frantz (LUX) | Alcyon-Dunlop | + 9' 59" |
| 9 | Joseph Pe (BEL) | Touriste-routier | s.t. |
| 10 | Bartolomeo Aimo (ITA) | Alcyon-Dunlop | s.t. |

== Stage 2 ==
23 June 1925 — Le Havre to Cherbourg-en-Cotentin, 371 km (231 mi)

Stage 2 result

| Rank | Rider | Team | Time |
|---|---|---|---|
| 1 | Romain Bellenger (FRA) | Alcyon-Dunlop | 15h 06' 00" |
| 2 | Adelin Benoît (BEL) | Thomann-Dunlop | s.t. |
| 3 | Nicolas Frantz (LUX) | Alcyon-Dunlop | s.t. |
| 4 | Auguste Verdyck (BEL) | Christophe Hutchinson | s.t. |
| 5 | Ottavio Bottecchia (ITA) | Automoto-Hutchinson | s.t. |
| 6 | Marcel Colleu (FRA) | JB Louvet-Pouchois | + 2" |
| 7 | Federico Gay (ITA) | Meteore-Wolber | + 4" |
| 8 | Bartolomeo Aimo (ITA) | Alcyon-Dunlop | s.t. |
| 9 | Arturo Bresciani (ITA) | Meteore-Wolber | s.t. |
| 10 | Luigi Lucotti (ITA) | Meteore-Wolber | + 6" |

General classification after stage 2

| Rank | Rider | Team | Time |
|---|---|---|---|
| 1 | Ottavio Bottecchia (ITA) | Automoto-Hutchinson | |
| 2 | Adelin Benoît (BEL) | Thomann-Dunlop | + 5' 59" |
| 3 | Auguste Verdyck (BEL) | Christophe Hutchinson | |
| 4 | | | |
| 5 | | | |
| 6 | | | |
| 7 | | | |
| 8 | | | |
| 9 | | | |
| 10 | | | |

== Stage 3 ==
25 June 1925 — Cherbourg-en-Cotentin to Brest, 405 km (252 mi)

Stage 3 result

| Rank | Rider | Team | Time |
|---|---|---|---|
| 1 | Louis Mottiat (BEL) | Alcyon-Dunlop | 16h 22' 30" |
| 2 | Adelin Benoît (BEL) | Thomann-Dunlop | + 5' 38" |
| 3 | Nicolas Frantz (LUX) | Alcyon-Dunlop | + 6' 37" |
| 4 | Francis Pélissier (FRA) | Automoto-Hutchinson | s.t. |
| 5 | Auguste Verdyck (BEL) | Christophe Hutchinson | s.t. |
| 6 | Omer Huyse (BEL) | Armor-Dunlop | s.t. |
| 7 | Théophile Beeckman (BEL) | Thomann-Dunlop | s.t. |
| 8 | Arturo Bresciani (ITA) | Meteore-Wolber | s.t. |
| 9 | Jean Alavoine (FRA) | J Alavoine-Dunlop | s.t. |
| 10 | Bartolomeo Aimo (ITA) | Alcyon-Dunlop | s.t. |

General classification after stage 3

| Rank | Rider | Team | Time |
|---|---|---|---|
| 1 | Adelin Benoît (BEL) | Thomann-Dunlop | |
| 2 | Ottavio Bottecchia (ITA) | Automoto-Hutchinson | + 8" |
| 3 | Auguste Verdyck (BEL) | Christophe Hutchinson | + 59" |
| 4 | | | |
| 5 | | | |
| 6 | | | |
| 7 | | | |
| 8 | | | |
| 9 | | | |
| 10 | | | |

== Stage 4 ==
26 June 1925 — Brest to Vannes, 208 km (129 mi)

Stage 4 result

| Rank | Rider | Team | Time |
|---|---|---|---|
| 1 | Nicolas Frantz (LUX) | Alcyon-Dunlop | 8h 22' 30" |
| 2 | Ottavio Bottecchia (ITA) | Automoto-Hutchinson | s.t. |
| 3 | Félix Sellier (BEL) | Alcyon-Dunlop | s.t. |
| 4 | Théo Wynsdau (BEL) | JB Louvet-Pouchois | s.t. |
| =5 | Auguste Verdyck (BEL) | Christophe Hutchinson | s.t. |
| =5 | Alfonso Piccin (ITA) | Christophe Hutchinson | s.t. |
| =5 | Bartolomeo Aimo (ITA) | Alcyon-Dunlop | s.t. |
| =5 | Jean Alavoine (FRA) | J Alavoine-Dunlop | s.t. |
| =5 | Adelin Benoît (BEL) | Thomann-Dunlop | s.t. |
| =5 | Romain Bellenger (FRA) | Alcyon-Dunlop | s.t. |

General classification after stage 4

| Rank | Rider | Team | Time |
|---|---|---|---|
| 1 | Adelin Benoît (BEL) | Thomann-Dunlop | |
| 2 | Ottavio Bottecchia (ITA) | Automoto-Hutchinson | + 8" |
| 3 | Auguste Verdyck (BEL) | Christophe Hutchinson | + 59" |
| 4 | | | |
| 5 | | | |
| 6 | | | |
| 7 | | | |
| 8 | | | |
| 9 | | | |
| 10 | | | |

== Stage 5 ==
27 June 1925 — Vannes to Les Sables-d'Olonne, 204 km (127 mi)

Stage 5 result

| Rank | Rider | Team | Time |
|---|---|---|---|
| 1 | Nicolas Frantz (LUX) | Alcyon-Dunlop | 7h 25' 42" |
| 2 | Félix Sellier (BEL) | Alcyon-Dunlop | s.t. |
| 3 | Ottavio Bottecchia (ITA) | Automoto-Hutchinson | s.t. |
| 4 | Théo Wynsdau (BEL) | JB Louvet-Pouchois | s.t. |
| 5 | Francis Pélissier (FRA) | Automoto-Hutchinson | s.t. |
| 6 | Michele Gordini (ITA) | Touriste-routier | s.t. |
| 7 | Philippe Thys (BEL) | Automoto-Hutchinson | s.t. |
| 8 | Lucien Buysse (BEL) | Automoto-Hutchinson | s.t. |
| 9 | Jules Buysse (BEL) | Automoto-Hutchinson | s.t. |
| 10 | Eugène Christophe (FRA) | JB Louvet-Pouchois | s.t. |

General classification after stage 5

| Rank | Rider | Team | Time |
|---|---|---|---|
| 1 | Adelin Benoît (BEL) | Thomann-Dunlop | |
| 2 | Ottavio Bottecchia (ITA) | Automoto-Hutchinson | + 8" |
| 3 | Auguste Verdyck (BEL) | Christophe Hutchinson | + 59" |
| 4 | | | |
| 5 | | | |
| 6 | | | |
| 7 | | | |
| 8 | | | |
| 9 | | | |
| 10 | | | |

== Stage 6 ==
28 June 1925 — Les Sables-d'Olonne to Bordeaux, 293 km (182 mi)

Stage 6 result

| Rank | Rider | Team | Time |
|---|---|---|---|
| 1 | Ottavio Bottecchia (ITA) | Automoto-Hutchinson | 11h 06' 51" |
| 2 | Nicolas Frantz (LUX) | Alcyon-Dunlop | s.t. |
| 3 | Félix Sellier (BEL) | Alcyon-Dunlop | s.t. |
| =4 | Jean Alavoine (FRA) | J Alavoine-Dunlop | s.t. |
| =4 | Albert Jordens (BEL) | Touriste-routier | s.t. |
| =4 | Philippe Thys (BEL) | Automoto-Hutchinson | s.t. |
| =4 | Lucien Buysse (BEL) | Automoto-Hutchinson | s.t. |
| =4 | Jules Buysse (BEL) | Automoto-Hutchinson | s.t. |
| =4 | Francis Pélissier (FRA) | Automoto-Hutchinson | s.t. |
| =4 | Eugène Christophe (FRA) | JB Louvet-Pouchois | s.t. |

General classification after stage 6

| Rank | Rider | Team | Time |
|---|---|---|---|
| 1 | Adelin Benoît (BEL) | Thomann-Dunlop | |
| 2 | Ottavio Bottecchia (ITA) | Automoto-Hutchinson | + 8" |
| 3 | Auguste Verdyck (BEL) | Christophe Hutchinson | + 59" |
| 4 | | | |
| 5 | | | |
| 6 | | | |
| 7 | | | |
| 8 | | | |
| 9 | | | |
| 10 | | | |

== Stage 7 ==
29 June 1925 — Bordeaux to Bayonne, 189 km (117 mi)

Stage 7 result

| Rank | Rider | Team | Time |
|---|---|---|---|
| 1 | Ottavio Bottecchia (ITA) | Automoto-Hutchinson | 6h 35' 21" |
| 2 | Auguste Verdyck (BEL) | Christophe Hutchinson | s.t. |
| 3 | Federico Gay (ITA) | Meteore-Wolber | s.t. |
| 4 | Lucien Buysse (BEL) | Automoto-Hutchinson | s.t. |
| 5 | Romain Bellenger (FRA) | Alcyon-Dunlop | s.t. |
| 6 | Arturo Bresciani (ITA) | Meteore-Wolber | s.t. |
| 7 | Hector Martin (BEL) | JB Louvet-Pouchois | + 4' 30" |
| 8 | Nicolas Frantz (LUX) | Alcyon-Dunlop | s.t. |
| 9 | Alfonso Piccin (ITA) | Christophe Hutchinson | s.t. |
| 10 | Adelin Benoît (BEL) | Thomann-Dunlop | s.t. |

General classification after stage 7

| Rank | Rider | Team | Time |
|---|---|---|---|
| 1 | Ottavio Bottecchia (ITA) | Automoto-Hutchinson | |
| 2 | Auguste Verdyck (BEL) | Christophe Hutchinson | + 51" |
| 3 | Adelin Benoît (BEL) | Thomann-Dunlop | + 4' 22" |
| 4 | | | |
| 5 | | | |
| 6 | | | |
| 7 | | | |
| 8 | | | |
| 9 | | | |
| 10 | | | |

== Stage 8 ==
1 July 1925 — Bayonne to Luchon, 326 km (203 mi)

Stage 8 result

| Rank | Rider | Team | Time |
|---|---|---|---|
| 1 | Adelin Benoît (BEL) | Thomann-Dunlop | 15h 18' 56" |
| 2 | Omer Huyse (BEL) | Armor-Dunlop | + 8' 34" |
| 3 | Ottavio Bottecchia (ITA) | Automoto-Hutchinson | + 11' 15" |
| 4 | Nicolas Frantz (LUX) | Alcyon-Dunlop | + 21' 19" |
| 5 | Albert Dejonghe (BEL) | JB Louvet-Pouchois | + 22' 04" |
| 6 | Romain Bellenger (FRA) | Alcyon-Dunlop | + 35' 50" |
| 7 | Théophile Beeckman (BEL) | Thomann-Dunlop | + 37' 04" |
| 8 | Bartolomeo Aimo (ITA) | Alcyon-Dunlop | + 40' 46" |
| 9 | Félix Sellier (BEL) | Alcyon-Dunlop | + 42' 42" |
| 10 | Lucien Buysse (BEL) | Automoto-Hutchinson | + 43' 41" |

General classification after stage 8

| Rank | Rider | Team | Time |
|---|---|---|---|
| 1 | Adelin Benoît (BEL) | Thomann-Dunlop | |
| 2 | Ottavio Bottecchia (ITA) | Automoto-Hutchinson | + 6' 53" |
| 3 | Omer Huyse (BEL) | Armor-Dunlop | + 24' 24" |
| 4 | | | |
| 5 | | | |
| 6 | | | |
| 7 | | | |
| 8 | | | |
| 9 | | | |
| 10 | | | |

== Stage 9 ==
3 July 1925 — Luchon to Perpignan, 323 km (201 mi)

Stage 9 result

| Rank | Rider | Team | Time |
|---|---|---|---|
| 1 | Nicolas Frantz (LUX) | Alcyon-Dunlop | 13h 08' 51" |
| 2 | Albert Dejonghe (BEL) | JB Louvet-Pouchois | s.t. |
| 3 | Lucien Buysse (BEL) | Automoto-Hutchinson | + 6' 05" |
| 4 | Ottavio Bottecchia (ITA) | Automoto-Hutchinson | s.t. |
| 5 | Romain Bellenger (FRA) | Alcyon-Dunlop | + 15' 12" |
| 6 | Hector Martin (BEL) | JB Louvet-Pouchois | s.t. |
| 7 | Félix Sellier (BEL) | Alcyon-Dunlop | + 18' 25" |
| 8 | Bartolomeo Aimo (ITA) | Alcyon-Dunlop | + 18' 30" |
| 9 | Auguste Verdyck (BEL) | Christophe Hutchinson | + 32' 09" |
| 10 | Omer Huyse (BEL) | Armor-Dunlop | + 35' 13" |

General classification after stage 9

| Rank | Rider | Team | Time |
|---|---|---|---|
| 1 | Ottavio Bottecchia (ITA) | Automoto-Hutchinson | |
| 2 | Nicolas Frantz (LUX) | Alcyon-Dunlop | + 13' 20" |
| 3 | Albert Dejonghe (BEL) | JB Louvet-Pouchois | + 26' 25" |
| 4 | | | |
| 5 | | | |
| 6 | | | |
| 7 | | | |
| 8 | | | |
| 9 | | | |
| 10 | | | |
