= 1925 Tour de France, Stage 10 to Stage 18 =

Cycling race stages

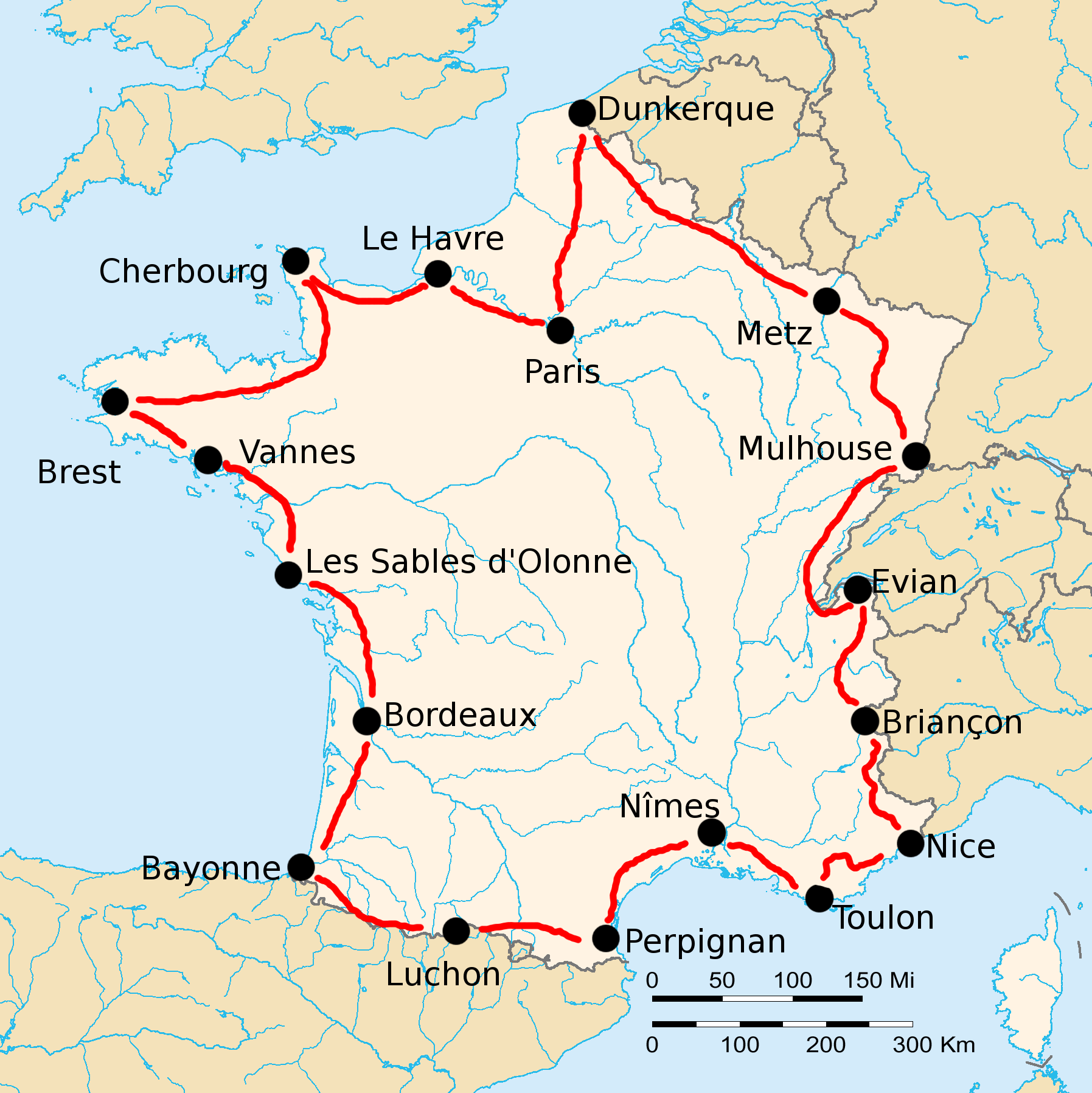
Route of the 1925 Tour de France

The 1925 Tour de France was the 19th edition of Tour de France, one of cycling's Grand Tours. The Tour began in Paris with a flat stage on 21 June, and Stage 10 occurred on 4 July with a flat stage from Perpignan. The race finished in Paris on 19 July.

== Stage 10 ==
4 July 1925 — Perpignan to Nîmes, 215 km (134 mi)

Stage 10 result

Rank	Rider	Team	Time
1	Théophile Beeckman (BEL)	Thomann-Dunlop	8h 44' 41"
2	Nicolas Frantz (LUX)	Alcyon-Dunlop	+ 14"
3	Félix Sellier (BEL)	Alcyon-Dunlop	s.t.
4	Ottavio Bottecchia (ITA)	Automoto-Hutchinson	s.t.
5	Adelin Benoît (BEL)	Thomann-Dunlop	s.t.
6	Lucien Buysse (BEL)	Automoto-Hutchinson	s.t.
7	Jules Buysse (BEL)	Automoto-Hutchinson	s.t.
8	Auguste Verdyck (BEL)	Christophe Hutchinson	s.t.
9	Arturo Bresciani (ITA)	Meteore-Wolber	s.t.
10	Federico Gay (ITA)	Meteore-Wolber	s.t.

General classification after stage 10

Rank	Rider	Team	Time
1	Ottavio Bottecchia (ITA)	Automoto-Hutchinson	
2	Nicolas Frantz (LUX)	Alcyon-Dunlop	+ 13' 20"
3	Albert Dejonghe (BEL)	JB Louvet-Pouchois	+ 28' 48"
4			
5			
6			
7			
8			
9			
10			

== Stage 11 ==
5 July 1925 — Nîmes to Toulon, 215 km (134 mi)

Stage 11 result

Rank	Rider	Team	Time
1	Lucien Buysse (BEL)	Automoto-Hutchinson	6h 54' 07"
2	Ottavio Bottecchia (ITA)	Automoto-Hutchinson	+ 48"
3	Albert Dejonghe (BEL)	JB Louvet-Pouchois	s.t.
4	Auguste Verdyck (BEL)	Christophe Hutchinson	+ 4' 49"
5	Nicolas Frantz (LUX)	Alcyon-Dunlop	+ 8' 25"
6	Hector Martin (BEL)	JB Louvet-Pouchois	s.t.
7	Félix Sellier (BEL)	Alcyon-Dunlop	s.t.
8	Federico Gay (ITA)	Meteore-Wolber	s.t.
9	Théophile Beeckman (BEL)	Thomann-Dunlop	s.t.
10	Michele Gordini (ITA)	Touriste-routier	+ 8' 41"

General classification after stage 11

Rank	Rider	Team	Time
1	Ottavio Bottecchia (ITA)	Automoto-Hutchinson	
2	Nicolas Frantz (LUX)	Alcyon-Dunlop	+ 20' 57"
3	Albert Dejonghe (BEL)	JB Louvet-Pouchois	+ 28' 48"
4			
5			
6			
7			
8			
9			
10			

== Stage 12 ==
7 July 1925 — Toulon to Nice, 280 km (170 mi)

Stage 12 result

Rank	Rider	Team	Time
1	Lucien Buysse (BEL)	Automoto-Hutchinson	11h 02' 12"
2	Ottavio Bottecchia (ITA)	Automoto-Hutchinson	s.t.
3	Bartolomeo Aimo (ITA)	Alcyon-Dunlop	+ 4' 27"
4	Nicolas Frantz (LUX)	Alcyon-Dunlop	+ 6' 20"
5	Michele Gordini (ITA)	Touriste-routier	s.t.
6	Adelin Benoît (BEL)	Thomann-Dunlop	+ 7' 28"
7	Omer Huyse (BEL)	Armor-Dunlop	s.t.
8	Jean Alavoine (FRA)	J Alavoine-Dunlop	+ 8' 35"
9	Arturo Bresciani (ITA)	Meteore-Wolber	s.t.
10	Auguste Verdyck (BEL)	Christophe Hutchinson	+ 12' 56"

General classification after stage 12

Rank	Rider	Team	Time
1	Ottavio Bottecchia (ITA)	Automoto-Hutchinson	
2	Nicolas Frantz (LUX)	Alcyon-Dunlop	+ 27' 17"
3	Albert Dejonghe (BEL)	JB Louvet-Pouchois	+ 46' 38"
4			
5			
6			
7			
8			
9			
10			

== Stage 13 ==
9 July 1925 — Nice to Briançon, 275 km (171 mi)

Stage 13 result

Rank	Rider	Team	Time
1	Bartolomeo Aimo (ITA)	Alcyon-Dunlop	13h 05' 03"
2	Ottavio Bottecchia (ITA)	Automoto-Hutchinson	+ 9' 57"
3	Nicolas Frantz (LUX)	Alcyon-Dunlop	+ 13' 37"
4	Lucien Buysse (BEL)	Automoto-Hutchinson	+ 14' 41"
5	Omer Huyse (BEL)	Armor-Dunlop	+ 18' 52"
6	Auguste Verdyck (BEL)	Christophe Hutchinson	+ 26' 19"
7	Angelo Gremo (ITA)	Meteore-Wolber	+ 28' 03"
8	Jean Alavoine (FRA)	J Alavoine-Dunlop	+ 31' 26"
9	Giovanni Canova (ITA)	Touriste-routier	+ 32' 55"
10	Théophile Beeckman (BEL)	Thomann-Dunlop	+ 35' 01"

General classification after stage 13

Rank	Rider	Team	Time
1	Ottavio Bottecchia (ITA)	Automoto-Hutchinson	
2	Nicolas Frantz (LUX)	Alcyon-Dunlop	+ 30' 57"
3	Bartolomeo Aimo (ITA)	Alcyon-Dunlop	+ 55' 49"
4			
5			
6			
7			
8			
9			
10			

== Stage 14 ==
11 July 1925 — Briançon to Évian, 303 km (188 mi)

Stage 14 result

Rank	Rider	Team	Time
1	Hector Martin (BEL)	JB Louvet-Pouchois	11h 36' 15"
2	Ottavio Bottecchia (ITA)	Automoto-Hutchinson	s.t.
3	Bartolomeo Aimo (ITA)	Alcyon-Dunlop	s.t.
4	Lucien Buysse (BEL)	Automoto-Hutchinson	s.t.
5	Albert Dejonghe (BEL)	JB Louvet-Pouchois	s.t.
6	Félix Sellier (BEL)	Alcyon-Dunlop	+ 16' 01"
7	Théophile Beeckman (BEL)	Thomann-Dunlop	+ 17' 37"
8	Auguste Verdyck (BEL)	Christophe Hutchinson	+ 25' 02"
9	Alfonso Piccin (ITA)	Christophe Hutchinson	+ 37' 44"
10	Nicolas Frantz (LUX)	Alcyon-Dunlop	s.t.

General classification after stage 14

Rank	Rider	Team	Time
1	Ottavio Bottecchia (ITA)	Automoto-Hutchinson	
2	Bartolomeo Aimo (ITA)	Alcyon-Dunlop	+ 55' 49"
3	Lucien Buysse (BEL)	Automoto-Hutchinson	+ 58' 38"
4			
5			
6			
7			
8			
9			
10			

== Stage 15 ==
13 July 1925 — Évian to Mulhouse, 373 km (232 mi)

Stage 15 result

Rank	Rider	Team	Time
1	Nicolas Frantz (LUX)	Alcyon-Dunlop	15h 42' 45"
2	Hector Martin (BEL)	JB Louvet-Pouchois	s.t.
3	Adelin Benoît (BEL)	Thomann-Dunlop	s.t.
4	Michele Gordini (ITA)	Touriste-routier	s.t.
5	Ottavio Bottecchia (ITA)	Automoto-Hutchinson	s.t.
=6	Jean Alavoine (FRA)	J Alavoine-Dunlop	s.t.
=6	Bartolomeo Aimo (ITA)	Alcyon-Dunlop	s.t.
=6	Théophile Beeckman (BEL)	Thomann-Dunlop	s.t.
=6	Romain Bellenger (FRA)	Alcyon-Dunlop	s.t.
=6	Arturo Bresciani (ITA)	Meteore-Wolber	s.t.

General classification after stage 15

Rank	Rider	Team	Time
1	Ottavio Bottecchia (ITA)	Automoto-Hutchinson	
2	Bartolomeo Aimo (ITA)	Alcyon-Dunlop	+ 55' 49"
3	Lucien Buysse (BEL)	Automoto-Hutchinson	+ 58' 38"
4			
5			
6			
7			
8			
9			
10			

== Stage 16 ==
15 July 1925 — Mulhouse to Metz, 334 km (208 mi)

Stage 16 result

Rank	Rider	Team	Time
1	Hector Martin (BEL)	JB Louvet-Pouchois	13h 24' 39"
2	Nicolas Frantz (LUX)	Alcyon-Dunlop	s.t.
3	Lucien Buysse (BEL)	Automoto-Hutchinson	s.t.
4	Albert Dejonghe (BEL)	JB Louvet-Pouchois	+ 4"
5	Auguste Verdyck (BEL)	Christophe Hutchinson	+ 15"
6	Félix Sellier (BEL)	Alcyon-Dunlop	+ 17"
7	Omer Huyse (BEL)	Armor-Dunlop	+ 56"
8	Jean Alavoine (FRA)	J Alavoine-Dunlop	+ 1' 01"
9	Ottavio Bottecchia (ITA)	Automoto-Hutchinson	+ 3' 02"
10	Federico Gay (ITA)	Meteore-Wolber	s.t.

General classification after stage 16

Rank	Rider	Team	Time
1	Ottavio Bottecchia (ITA)	Automoto-Hutchinson	
2	Lucien Buysse (BEL)	Automoto-Hutchinson	+ 55' 36"
3	Nicolas Frantz (LUX)	Alcyon-Dunlop	+ 55' 39"
4			
5			
6			
7			
8			
9			
10			

== Stage 17 ==
17 July 1925 — Metz to Dunkerque, 433 km (269 mi)

Stage 17 result

Rank	Rider	Team	Time
1	Hector Martin (BEL)	JB Louvet-Pouchois	17h 07' 25"
2	Bartolomeo Aimo (ITA)	Alcyon-Dunlop	s.t.
3	Lucien Buysse (BEL)	Automoto-Hutchinson	s.t.
4	Albert Dejonghe (BEL)	JB Louvet-Pouchois	+ 47"
5	Ottavio Bottecchia (ITA)	Automoto-Hutchinson	+ 1' 16"
6	Auguste Verdyck (BEL)	Christophe Hutchinson	+ 7' 31"
7	Omer Huyse (BEL)	Armor-Dunlop	+ 11' 24"
8	Federico Gay (ITA)	Meteore-Wolber	+ 13' 50"
9	Henri Touzard (FRA)	Touriste-routier	+ 13' 54"
10	Félix Sellier (BEL)	Alcyon-Dunlop	+ 16' 07"

General classification after stage 17

Rank	Rider	Team	Time
1	Ottavio Bottecchia (ITA)	Automoto-Hutchinson	
2	Lucien Buysse (BEL)	Automoto-Hutchinson	+ 54' 20"
3	Bartolomeo Aimo (ITA)	Alcyon-Dunlop	+ 56' 37"
4			
5			
6			
7			
8			
9			
10			

== Stage 18 ==
19 July 1925 — Dunkerque to Paris, 343 km (213 mi)

Stage 18 result

Rank	Rider	Team	Time
1	Ottavio Bottecchia (ITA)	Automoto-Hutchinson	14h 53' 06"
2	Romain Bellenger (FRA)	Alcyon-Dunlop	s.t.
3	Bartolomeo Aimo (ITA)	Alcyon-Dunlop	s.t.
4	Lucien Buysse (BEL)	Automoto-Hutchinson	s.t.
5	Jules Buysse (BEL)	Automoto-Hutchinson	s.t.
6	Félix Sellier (BEL)	Alcyon-Dunlop	+ 54"
7	Nicolas Frantz (LUX)	Alcyon-Dunlop	s.t.
8	Federico Gay (ITA)	Meteore-Wolber	s.t.
9	Adelin Benoît (BEL)	Thomann-Dunlop	s.t.
10	Jean Alavoine (FRA)	J Alavoine-Dunlop	+ 1' 56"

General classification after stage 18

Rank	Rider	Team	Time
1	Ottavio Bottecchia (ITA)	Automoto-Hutchinson	219h 10' 18"
2	Lucien Buysse (BEL)	Automoto-Hutchinson	+ 54' 20"
3	Bartolomeo Aimo (ITA)	Alcyon-Dunlop	+ 56' 37"
4	Nicolas Frantz (LUX)	Alcyon-Dunlop	+ 1h 11' 24"
5	Albert Dejonghe (BEL)	JB Louvet-Pouchois	+ 1h 27' 42"
6	Théophile Beeckman (BEL)	Thomann-Dunlop	+ 2h 24' 43"
7	Omer Huyse (BEL)	Armor-Dunlop	+ 2h 33' 38"
8	Auguste Verdyck (BEL)	Christophe Hutchinson	+ 2h 44' 36"
9	Félix Sellier (BEL)	Alcyon-Dunlop	+ 2h 45' 59"
10	Federico Gay (ITA)	Meteore-Wolber	+ 4h 06' 03"
