= List of Tour de France general classification winners =

General classification (GC) at the Tour de France
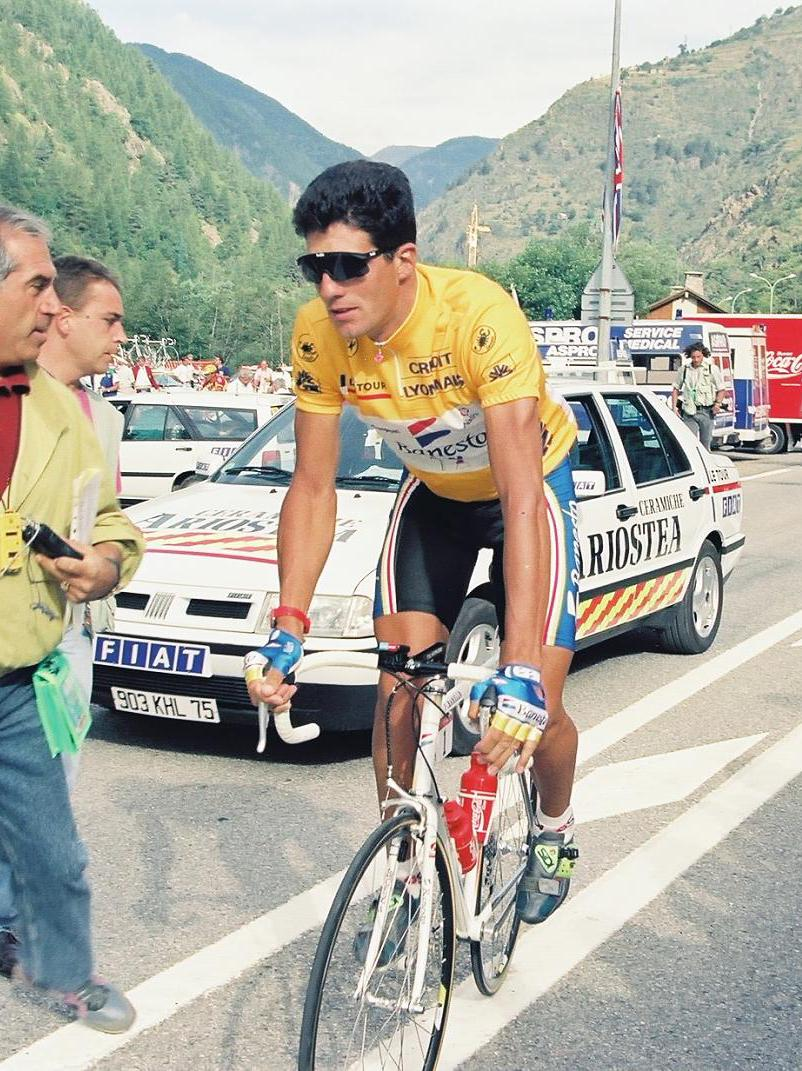
- Miguel Induráin, winner of five consecutive GC Tour titles from 1991 to 1995.
- Location: Since 1975, finished on the Champs-Élysées in Paris
- Dates: July annually

The Tour de France is an annual road bicycle race held over 23 days in July. Established in 1903 by newspaper L'Auto, the Tour is the best-known and most prestigious of cycling's three "Grand Tours", the others being the Giro d'Italia and the Vuelta a España. The race usually covers approximately 3,500 kilometres (2,200 mi), passing through France and neighbouring countries. The race is broken into day-long stages, and individual finishing times for each stage are totalled to determine the overall winner at the end of the race. The course changes every year, but has finished in Paris every year except 2024, when it finished in Nice. Since 1975, it has finished along the Champs-Élysées.

The rider with the lowest aggregate time at the end of each day wears the yellow jersey, representing the leader of the general classification. There are other jerseys: the green jersey, worn by the leader of the points classification; the polka dot jersey, worn by the leader of the mountains classification; and the white jersey, worn by the leader of the young rider classification.

Sixty-four individual cyclists from 15 countries have won a combined total of 106 Tours, the most recent winner being Slovenian Tadej Pogačar. Pogačar, Jacques Anquetil, Eddy Merckx, Bernard Hinault and Miguel Induráin hold the record for the most victories at five each, (Note: Lance Armstrong won seven consecutive Tours from 1999 to 2005, but in 2012, he was stripped of all titles by the UCI because of his use of performance-enhancing drugs. The Tour director Christian Prudhomme had previously said that if this happened, there would be no alternative winners for those years.) with Induráin being the only one to win five consecutive Tours. Winners have ranged in age from 19 (Henri Cornet, 1904) to 36 years (Firmin Lambot, 1922). The most common nationality among winners is French (36 Tours won by 21 cyclists), followed by Belgian (18 Tours won by 10 cyclists) and Spanish (12 Tours won by 7 cyclists).

== History ==
The Tour de France was established in 1903 by the newspaper L'Auto, in an attempt to increase its sales. The first race was won by Frenchman Maurice Garin. He won again the next year, but was disqualified after allegations that he had been transported by car or rail. Henri Cornet became the winner after the dispute was settled, and is the youngest to win the Tour. Following the scandals in 1904, the scoring system was changed from being time-based to a point-based system, in which the cyclist who has the fewest points at the end of the race is victorious. This system lasted until 1912, when the time-based system was reintroduced. French cyclists won the first six Tours, before François Faber of Luxembourg won in 1909, the first non-Frenchman to win.

Belgian riders were more successful before and after the First World War, which caused the Tour to be suspended from 1915 to 1918. In the 1920s, trade teams dominated the Tour, and cyclists such as Nicolas Frantz won the Tour with the Alcyon team. When Alcyon cyclist Maurice De Waele won the Tour in 1929 while ill, the organisers decided to introduce national teams the following year, to stop team tactics from undermining the race. Because of the Second World War, the Tour de France was suspended from 1940 to 1946.

The yellow jersey (French: maillot jaune) of 1963, worn by general classification leader Gilbert Desmet of Wiel's–Groene Leeuw

After the Second World War, no one dominated the Tour until Louison Bobet, who won three consecutive Tours from 1953 to 1955—he was the first person to achieve this feat. This was bettered by the French cyclist Jacques Anquetil, who won four successive Tours from 1961 to 1964. Anquetil, who also won in 1957, became the first to win five Tours. Anquetil's five victories were matched when Belgian cyclist Eddy Merckx won four successive Tours from 1969 to 1972 and the 1974 Tour. Merckx is the only person to have won the general, points and king of the mountains classifications in the same Tour, which he achieved in 1969.

Merckx looked to be heading for a record sixth Tour victory in 1975, but Bernard Thévenet beat him, becoming the first French winner in seven years. Thévenet won again in 1977, but he was eclipsed in the following years by fellow Frenchman Bernard Hinault, who won consecutive Tours in 1978 and 1979. Hinault won the Tour at his first attempt in 1978, becoming one of 11 cyclists (including Anquetil, Merckx, Hugo Koblet and Fausto Coppi) who managed to do so. In 1980, the Tour was won by Joop Zoetemelk, after Hinault had to pull out because of tendinitis. Hinault returned and won in 1981 and 1982. Hinault sat out the Tour in 1983, and Laurent Fignon, another Frenchman, achieved victory. Fignon won again the following year, beating Hinault, before Hinault recovered in 1985 to win his fifth Tour.

American Greg LeMond became the first non-European to win the Tour in 1986. LeMond won again in 1989 to win the Tour by finishing eight seconds ahead of Fignon, the smallest winning margin in the Tour's history. LeMond also won in 1990. In 1991, Spaniard Miguel Induráin won his first Tour. Induráin came to dominate the Tour, winning four more Tours consecutively—making him the first person to win five consecutive Tours. He tried to win a record sixth Tour in 1996, but was beaten by Bjarne Riis, who later admitted to using Erythropoietin. Jan Ullrich and Marco Pantani won in 1997 and 1998, respectively, but Pantani's victory was overshadowed by doping scandals.

The 1999 Tour saw the first of Lance Armstrong's seven consecutive victories. He was stripped of his titles in October 2012, when it emerged he had used performance-enhancing drugs throughout much of his career, including the Tour de France victories. Floyd Landis won the Tour in 2006, but was later stripped of his title after a failed drug test. Óscar Pereiro was subsequently awarded the victory. Alberto Contador won the 2007 Tour with the Discovery Channel. The 2007 Tour was also marred by doping scandals, thus Contador was unable to defend his title in 2008, as his Astana team was banned for its part in the controversy. Fellow Spaniard Carlos Sastre of Team CSC won. Contador and Astana returned in 2009 to regain the title. He won the Tour again in 2010, but was later stripped of his title after he was found guilty of doping. Runner-up Andy Schleck was awarded the victory.

Cadel Evans became the first Australian to win the Tour in 2011. In 2012, Bradley Wiggins became the first British cyclist to win the Tour. Chris Froome became the second successive British winner in 2013, which was the 100th edition of the race. He could not defend his title the following year, as he crashed out in stage 5, with Vincenzo Nibali winning his first Tour. Froome regained the title in 2015 and successfully defended it in 2016, the first rider in over 20 years to do so. Froome won the Tour for a third consecutive year in 2017. Froome's teammate, Geraint Thomas, was the winner of the 2018 race. Egan Bernal won in 2019, becoming the first Colombian cyclist to win the Tour, finishing ahead of his teammate Thomas.

The 2020 Tour was postponed, to start on 29 August, following the French government's extension of a ban on mass gatherings after the worldwide COVID-19 outbreak. This was the first time since the end of World War II that the Tour was not held in July. It was won by Tadej Pogačar, who became the first Slovenian rider to win the race as well as one of the youngest winners in Tour history. He repeated as champion in the 2021 edition. The following year, Jonas Vingegaard became the first Danish rider since 1996 to win the race. Vingegaard won again in 2023, by 7 minutes and 29 seconds from Pogačar. Pogačar won again in 2024 and became the first person to win the Giro and Tour in the same year since Pantani in 1998. Pogačar retained his title in 2025, beating Vingegaard by 4 minutes and 24 seconds. Pogačar again retained his title in 2026, beating Remco Evenepoel by 6 minutes and 26 seconds.

== Winners ==
†	Also won points classification in the same year
*	Also won mountains classification in the same year
#	Also won young rider classification in the same year
‡	Also won points and mountains classification in the same year
§	Also won the mountains and young rider classification in the same year

- The "Year" column refers to the year the competition was held, and wikilinks to the article about that season.
- The "Distance" column refers to the distance over which the race was held.
- The "Margin" column refers to the margin of time or points by which the winner defeated the runner-up.
- The "Stage wins" column refers to the number of stage wins the winner had during the race.

Tour de France general classification winners
Year	Country	Cyclist	Sponsor/Team	Distance	Time/Points	Margin	Stage wins
1903	France	Maurice Garin	La Française	2,428 km (1,509 mi)	94h 33′ 14″	+ 2h 59′ 21″	3
1904	France	Henri Cornet (Note: Henri Cornet was declared the winner of the 1904 Tour de France after the disqualification of Maurice Garin for cheating.)	Conte	2,428 km (1,509 mi)	96h 05′ 55″	+ 2h 16′ 14″	1
1905	France	Louis Trousselier	Peugeot–Wolber	2,994 km (1,860 mi)	35	26	5
1906	France	René Pottier	Peugeot–Wolber	4,637 km (2,881 mi)	31	8	5
1907	France	Lucien Petit-Breton	Peugeot–Wolber	4,488 km (2,789 mi)	47	19	2
1908	France	Lucien Petit-Breton	Peugeot–Wolber	4,497 km (2,794 mi)	36	32	5
1909	Luxembourg	François Faber	Alcyon–Dunlop	4,498 km (2,795 mi)	37	20	6
1910	France	Octave Lapize	Alcyon–Dunlop	4,734 km (2,942 mi)	63	4	4
1911	France	Gustave Garrigou	Alcyon–Dunlop	5,343 km (3,320 mi)	43	18	2
1912	Belgium	Odile Defraye	Alcyon–Dunlop	5,289 km (3,286 mi)	49	59	3
1913	Belgium	Philippe Thys	Peugeot–Wolber	5,287 km (3,285 mi)	197h 54′ 00″	+ 8′ 37″	1
1914	Belgium	Philippe Thys	Peugeot–Wolber	5,380 km (3,340 mi)	200h 28′ 48″	+ 1′ 50″	1
1915	—	Not contested due to World War I	—	—	—	—	—
1916	—	Not contested due to World War I	—	—	—	—	—
1917	—	Not contested due to World War I	—	—	—	—	—
1918	—	Not contested due to World War I	—	—	—	—	—
1919	Belgium	Firmin Lambot	La Sportive	5,560 km (3,450 mi)	231h 07′ 15″	+ 1h 42′ 54″	1
1920	Belgium	Philippe Thys	La Sportive	5,503 km (3,419 mi)	228h 36′ 13″	+ 57′ 21″	4
1921	Belgium	Léon Scieur	La Sportive	5,485 km (3,408 mi)	221h 50′ 26″	+ 18′ 36″	2
1922	Belgium	Firmin Lambot	Peugeot–Wolber	5,375 km (3,340 mi)	222h 08′ 06″	+ 41′ 15″	0
1923	France	Henri Pélissier	Automoto–Hutchinson	5,386 km (3,347 mi)	222h 15′ 30″	+ 30 '41″	3
1924	Italy	Ottavio Bottecchia	Automoto	5,425 km (3,371 mi)	226h 18′ 21″	+ 35′ 36″	4
1925	Italy	Ottavio Bottecchia	Automoto–Hutchinson	5,440 km (3,380 mi)	219h 10′ 18″	+ 54′ 20″	4
1926	Belgium	Lucien Buysse	Automoto–Hutchinson	5,745 km (3,570 mi)	238h 44′ 25″	+ 1h 22′ 25″	2
1927	Luxembourg	Nicolas Frantz	Alcyon–Dunlop	5,398 km (3,354 mi)	198h 16′ 42″	+ 1h 48′ 41″	3
1928	Luxembourg	Nicolas Frantz	Alcyon–Dunlop	5,476 km (3,403 mi)	192h 48′ 58″	+ 50′ 07″	5
1929	Belgium	Maurice De Waele	Alcyon–Dunlop	5,286 km (3,285 mi)	186h 39′ 15″	+44′ 23″	1
1930	France	André Leducq	France	4,822 km (2,996 mi)	172h 12′ 16″	+ 14′ 13″	2
1931	France	Antonin Magne	France	5,091 km (3,163 mi)	177h 10′ 03″	+ 12′ 56″	1
1932	France	André Leducq	France	4,479 km (2,783 mi)	154h 11′ 49″	+ 24′ 03″	6
1933	France	Georges Speicher	France	4,395 km (2,731 mi)	147h 51′ 37″	+ 4′ 01″	3
1934	France	Antonin Magne	France	4,470 km (2,780 mi)	147h 13′ 58″	+ 27′ 31″	3
1935	Belgium	Romain Maes	Belgium	4,338 km (2,696 mi)	141h 23′ 00″	+ 17′ 52″	3
1936	Belgium	Sylvère Maes	Belgium	4,442 km (2,760 mi)	142h 47′ 32″	+ 26′ 55″	4
1937	France	Roger Lapébie	France	4,415 km (2,743 mi)	138h 58′ 31″	+ 7′ 17″	3
1938	Italy	Gino Bartali*	Italy	4,694 km (2,917 mi)	148h 29′ 12″	+ 18′ 27″	2
1939	Belgium	Sylvère Maes*	Belgium	4,224 km (2,625 mi)	132h 03′ 17″	+ 30′ 38″	2
1940	—	Not contested due to World War II	—	—	—	—	—
1941	—	Not contested due to World War II	—	—	—	—	—
1942	—	Not contested due to World War II	—	—	—	—	—
1943	—	Not contested due to World War II	—	—	—	—	—
1944	—	Not contested due to World War II	—	—	—	—	—
1945	—	Not contested due to World War II	—	—	—	—	—
1946	—	—	—	—	—	—	—
1947	France	Jean Robic	France	4,642 km (2,884 mi)	148h 11′ 25″	+ 3′ 58″	3
1948	Italy	Gino Bartali*	Italy	4,922 km (3,058 mi)	147h 10′ 36″	+ 26′ 16″	7
1949	Italy	Fausto Coppi*	Italy	4,808 km (2,988 mi)	149h 40′ 49″	+ 10′ 55″	3
1950	Switzerland	Ferdinand Kübler	Switzerland	4,773 km (2,966 mi)	145h 36′ 56″	+ 9′ 30″	3
1951	Switzerland	Hugo Koblet	Switzerland	4,690 km (2,910 mi)	142h 20′ 14″	+ 22′ 00″	5
1952	Italy	Fausto Coppi*	Italy	4,898 km (3,043 mi)	151h 57′ 20″	+ 28′ 17″	5
1953	France	Louison Bobet	France	4,476 km (2,781 mi)	129h 23′ 25″	+ 14′ 18″	2
1954	France	Louison Bobet	France	4,656 km (2,893 mi)	140h 06′ 05″	+ 15′ 49″	3
1955	France	Louison Bobet	France	4,495 km (2,793 mi)	130h 29′ 26″	+ 4′ 53″	2
1956	France	Roger Walkowiak	France	4,498 km (2,795 mi)	124h 01′ 16″	+ 1′ 25″	0
1957	France	Jacques Anquetil	France	4,669 km (2,901 mi)	135h 44′ 42″	+ 14′ 56″	4
1958	Luxembourg	Charly Gaul	Luxembourg	4,319 km (2,684 mi)	116h 59′ 05″	+ 3′ 10″	4
1959	Spain	Federico Bahamontes*	Spain	4,358 km (2,708 mi)	123h 46′ 45″	+ 4′ 01″	1
1960	Italy	Gastone Nencini	Italy	4,173 km (2,593 mi)	112h 08′ 42″	+ 5′ 02″	0
1961	France	Jacques Anquetil	France	4,397 km (2,732 mi)	122h 01′ 33″	+ 12′ 14″	2
1962	France	Jacques Anquetil	Saint-Raphaël–Helyett–Hutchinson	4,274 km (2,656 mi)	114h 31′ 54″	+ 4′ 59″	2
1963	France	Jacques Anquetil	Saint-Raphaël–Gitane–R. Geminiani	4,138 km (2,571 mi)	113h 30′ 05″	+ 3′ 35″	4
1964	France	Jacques Anquetil	Saint-Raphaël–Gitane–Dunlop	4,504 km (2,799 mi)	127h 09′ 44″	+ 55″	4
1965	Italy	Felice Gimondi	Salvarani	4,188 km (2,602 mi)	116h 42′ 06″	+ 2′ 40″	3
1966	France	Lucien Aimar	Ford France–Hutchinson	4,329 km (2,690 mi)	117h 34′ 21″	+ 1′ 07″	0
1967	France	Roger Pingeon	Peugeot–BP–Michelin	4,779 km (2,970 mi)	136h 53′ 50″	+ 3′ 40″	1
1968	Netherlands	Jan Janssen	Pelforth–Sauvage–Lejeune	4,492 km (2,791 mi)	133h 49′ 42″	+ 38″	2
1969	Belgium	Eddy Merckx^{‡}	Faema	4,117 km (2,558 mi)	116h 16′ 02″	+ 17′ 54″	6
1970	Belgium	Eddy Merckx*	Faemino–Faema	4,254 km (2,643 mi)	119h 31′ 49″	+ 12′ 41″	8
1971	Belgium	Eddy Merckx^{†}	Molteni	3,608 km (2,242 mi)	96h 45′ 14″	+ 9′ 51″	4
1972	Belgium	Eddy Merckx^{†}	Molteni	3,846 km (2,390 mi)	108h 17′ 18″	+ 10′ 41″	6
1973	Spain	Luis Ocaña	Bic	4,090 km (2,540 mi)	122h 25′ 34″	+ 15′ 51″	6
1974	Belgium	Eddy Merckx	Molteni	4,098 km (2,546 mi)	116h 16′ 58″	+ 8′ 04″	8
1975	France	Bernard Thévenet	Peugeot–BP–Michelin	4,000 km (2,500 mi)	114h 35′ 31″	+ 2′ 47″	2
1976	Belgium	Lucien Van Impe	Gitane–Campagnolo	4,017 km (2,496 mi)	116h 22′ 23″	+ 4′ 14″	1
1977	France	Bernard Thévenet	Peugeot–Esso–Michelin	4,096 km (2,545 mi)	115h 38′ 30″	+ 48″	1
1978	France	Bernard Hinault	Renault–Gitane–Campagnolo	3,908 km (2,428 mi)	108h 18′ 00″	+ 3′ 56″	3
1979	France	Bernard Hinault^{†}	Renault–Gitane	3,765 km (2,339 mi)	103h 06′ 50″	+ 13′ 07″	7
1980	Netherlands	Joop Zoetemelk	TI–Raleigh–Creda	3,842 km (2,387 mi)	109h 19′ 14″	+ 6′ 55″	2
1981	France	Bernard Hinault	Renault–Elf–Gitane	3,753 km (2,332 mi)	96h 19′ 38″	+ 14′ 34″	5
1982	France	Bernard Hinault	Renault–Elf–Gitane	3,507 km (2,179 mi)	92h 08′ 46″	+ 6′ 21″	4
1983	France	Laurent Fignon^{#}	Renault–Elf	3,809 km (2,367 mi)	105h 07′ 52″	+ 4′ 04″	1
1984	France	Laurent Fignon	Renault–Elf	4,021 km (2,499 mi)	112h 03′ 40″	+ 10′ 32″	5
1985	France	Bernard Hinault	La Vie Claire	4,109 km (2,553 mi)	113h 24′ 23″	+ 1′ 42″	2
1986	United States	Greg LeMond	La Vie Claire	4,094 km (2,544 mi)	110h 35′ 19″	+ 3′ 10″	1
1987	Ireland	Stephen Roche	Carrera Jeans–Vagabond	4,231 km (2,629 mi)	115h 27′ 42″	+ 40″	1
1988	Spain	Pedro Delgado	Reynolds	3,286 km (2,042 mi)	84h 27′ 53″	+ 7′ 13″	1
1989	United States	Greg LeMond	AD Renting–W-Cup–Bottecchia	3,285 km (2,041 mi)	87h 38′ 35″	+ 8″	3
1990	United States	Greg LeMond	Z–Tomasso	3,504 km (2,177 mi)	90h 43′ 20″	+ 2′ 16″	0
1991	Spain	Miguel Induráin	Banesto	3,914 km (2,432 mi)	101h 01′ 20″	+ 3′ 36″	2
1992	Spain	Miguel Induráin	Banesto	3,983 km (2,475 mi)	100h 49′ 30″	+ 4′ 35″	3
1993	Spain	Miguel Induráin	Banesto	3,714 km (2,308 mi)	95h 57′ 09″	+ 4′ 59″	2
1994	Spain	Miguel Induráin	Banesto	3,978 km (2,472 mi)	103h 38′ 38″	+ 5′ 39″	1
1995	Spain	Miguel Induráin	Banesto	3,635 km (2,259 mi)	92h 44′ 59″	+ 4′ 35″	2
1996	Denmark	Bjarne Riis (Note: Bjarne Riis admitted to doping during the 1996 Tour de France. The organizers of the Tour de France stated that they no longer consider him to be the winner, although Union Cycliste Internationale has so far refused to change the official status owing to the amount of time that has passed since his win. Jan Ullrich was placed second on the podium in Paris.)	Team Telekom	3,765 km (2,339 mi)	95h 57′ 16″	+ 1′ 41″	2
1997	Germany	Jan Ullrich^{#}	Team Telekom	3,950 km (2,450 mi)	100h 30′ 35″	+ 9′ 09″	2
1998	Italy	Marco Pantani	Mercatone Uno–Bianchi	3,875 km (2,408 mi)	92h 49′ 46″	+ 3′ 21″	2
1999	—	No winner	—	3,687 km (2,291 mi)	—	—	—
2000	—	No winner	—	3,662 km (2,275 mi)	—	—	—
2001	—	No winner	—	3,458 km (2,149 mi)	—	—	—
2002	—	No winner	—	3,278 km (2,037 mi)	—	—	—
2003	—	No winner	—	3,427 km (2,129 mi)	—	—	—
2004	—	No winner	—	3,391 km (2,107 mi)	—	—	—
2005	—	No winner	—	3,359 km (2,087 mi)	—	—	—
2006	Spain	Óscar Pereiro (Note: Floyd Landis was the winner at the podium ceremony in Paris on the last day of the 2006 Tour, but subsequently was found to have tested positive for performance-enhancing drugs during stage 17 of the race. The United States Anti-Doping Agency found him guilty of using synthetic testosterone during the race and stripped him of his title on 20 September 2007.)	Caisse d'Epargne–Illes Balears	3,657 km (2,272 mi)	89h 40′ 27″	+ 32″	0
2007	Spain	Alberto Contador^{#}	Discovery Channel	3,570 km (2,220 mi)	91h 00′ 26″	+ 23″	1
2008	Spain	Carlos Sastre*	Team CSC	3,559 km (2,211 mi)	87h 52′ 52″	+ 58″	1
2009	Spain	Alberto Contador	Astana	3,459 km (2,149 mi)	85h 48′ 35″	+ 4′ 11″	2
2010	Luxembourg	Andy Schleck^{#} (Note: Alberto Contador was the winner at the podium ceremony in Paris on the last day of the 2010 Tour, but subsequently was found to have tested positive for the prohibited substance clenbuterol on a rest day. The Court of Arbitration for Sport found him guilty of using clenbuterol during the race and stripped him of his title on 6 February 2012.)	Team Saxo Bank	3,642 km (2,263 mi)	91h 59′ 27″	+ 1′ 22″	2
2011	Australia	Cadel Evans	BMC Racing Team	3,430 km (2,130 mi)	86h 12′ 22″	+ 1′ 34″	1
2012	Great Britain	Bradley Wiggins	Team Sky	3,496 km (2,172 mi)	87h 34′ 47″	+ 3′ 21″	2
2013	Great Britain	Chris Froome	Team Sky	3,404 km (2,115 mi)	83h 56′ 20″	+ 4′ 20″	3
2014	Italy	Vincenzo Nibali	Astana	3,660.5 km (2,274.5 mi)	89h 59′ 06″	+ 7′ 37″	4
2015	Great Britain	Chris Froome*	Team Sky	3,360.3 km (2,088.0 mi)	84h 46′ 14″	+ 1′ 12″	1
2016	Great Britain	Chris Froome	Team Sky	3,529 km (2,193 mi)	89h 04′ 48″	+ 4′ 05″	2
2017	Great Britain	Chris Froome	Team Sky	3,540 km (2,200 mi)	86h 20′ 55″	+ 54″	0
2018	Great Britain	Geraint Thomas	Team Sky	3,349 km (2,081 mi)	83h 17′ 13″	+ 1′ 51″	2
2019	Colombia	Egan Bernal^{#}	Team INEOS	3,366 km (2,092 mi)	82h 57′ 00″	+ 1′ 11″	0
2020	Slovenia	Tadej Pogačar^{§}	UAE Team Emirates	3,484 km (2,165 mi)	87h 20′ 13″	+ 59″	3
2021	Slovenia	Tadej Pogačar^{§}	UAE Team Emirates	3,414.4 km (2,121.6 mi)	82h 56′ 36″	+ 5′ 20″	3
2022	Denmark	Jonas Vingegaard*	Team Jumbo–Visma	3,328 km (2,068 mi)	79h 32′ 29″	+ 2′ 43″	2
2023	Denmark	Jonas Vingegaard	Team Jumbo–Visma	3,406 km (2,116 mi)	82h 05′ 42″	+ 7′ 29″	1
2024	Slovenia	Tadej Pogačar	UAE Team Emirates	3,498 km (2,174 mi)	83h 38′ 56″	+ 6′ 17″	6
2025	Slovenia	Tadej Pogačar*	UAE Team Emirates XRG	3,320 km (2,060 mi)	76h 00′ 32″	+ 4′ 24″	4
2026	Slovenia	Tadej Pogačar	UAE Team Emirates XRG	3,245 km (2,016 mi)	73h 56′ 26″	+ 6′ 26″	5

=== Multiple winners ===
The following riders have won the Tour de France on more than one occasion.

Alberto Contador won three Tours, but was stripped of one following an anti-doping violation.^{[D]}

Lance Armstrong was removed from the head of the list after having all seven of his Tour victories stripped when he was found guilty of repeated doping offences.

Multiple winners of the Tour de France general classification
Cyclist	Total	Years
Jacques Anquetil (FRA)	5	1957, 1961, 1962, 1963, 1964
Eddy Merckx (BEL)	5	1969, 1970, 1971, 1972, 1974
Bernard Hinault (FRA)	5	1978, 1979, 1981, 1982, 1985
Miguel Induráin (ESP)	5	1991, 1992, 1993, 1994, 1995
Tadej Pogačar (SLO)	5	2020, 2021, 2024, 2025, 2026
Chris Froome (GBR)	4	2013, 2015, 2016, 2017
Philippe Thys (BEL)	3	1913, 1914, 1920
Louison Bobet (FRA)	3	1953, 1954, 1955
Greg LeMond (USA)	3	1986, 1989, 1990
Lucien Petit-Breton (FRA)	2	1907, 1908
Firmin Lambot (BEL)	2	1919, 1922
Ottavio Bottecchia (ITA)	2	1924, 1925
Nicolas Frantz (LUX)	2	1927, 1928
André Leducq (FRA)	2	1930, 1932
Antonin Magne (FRA)	2	1931, 1934
Sylvère Maes (BEL)	2	1936, 1939
Gino Bartali (ITA)	2	1938, 1948
Fausto Coppi (ITA)	2	1949, 1952
Bernard Thévenet (FRA)	2	1975, 1977
Laurent Fignon (FRA)	2	1983, 1984
Alberto Contador (ESP)	2	2007, 2009
Jonas Vingegaard (DEN)	2	2022, 2023

=== By nationality ===
Tour de France general classification winners by nationality
Country	Wins	Winning cyclists
France	36	21
Belgium	18	10
Spain	12	7
Italy	10	7
Great Britain	6	3
Luxembourg	5	4
Slovenia	5	1
Denmark	3	2
United States	3	1
Switzerland	2	2
Netherlands	2	2
Ireland	1	1
Germany	1	1
Australia	1	1
Colombia	1	1

== See also ==
- List of Tour de France secondary classification winners
- Yellow jersey statistics
- List of Grand Tour general classification winners
