= 1925 Tour of the Basque Country =

Race details
- Dates: 6–9 August 1925
- Stages: 3
- Distance: 670 km (420 mi)
- Winning time: 24h 50' 34"

Results
	Winner	Auguste Verdyck (BEL)
	Second	Joseph Pe (BEL)
	Third	Marcel Bidot (FRA)

The 1925 Tour of the Basque Country was the second edition of the Tour of the Basque Country cycle race and was held from 6 August to 9 August 1925. The race started and finished in Bilbao. The race was won by Auguste Verdyck.

== General classification ==
Final general classification

Rank	Rider	Time
1	Auguste Verdyck (BEL)	24h 50' 34"
2	Joseph Pe (BEL)	+ 5' 33"
3	Marcel Bidot (FRA)	+ 9' 40"
4	Albert Dejonghe (BEL)	+ 12' 46"
5	Adelin Benoît (BEL)	+ 15' 07"
6	Camille Van De Casteele (BEL)	+ 26' 38"
7	Aimé Dossche (BEL)	+ 29' 00"
8	Louis Mottiat (BEL)	+ 30' 14"
9	Jules Matton (BEL)	+ 30' 40"
10	Jules Buysse (BEL)	+ 30' 48"
