= Charles Roux =

- Charles Roux (biologist)
- Charles Roux (cyclist)
