= Graziella (bicycle) =

Folding bicycle

Graziella is an Italian compact, folding bicycle designed by the renowned Rinaldo Donzelli in 1964; since then, the name Graziella is used in Italy for any bicycle that shares the same fundamental design. The original Graziella was built by Carnielli and sold under the Bottecchia marque.

== Cultural significance ==
Graziella was one of the icons of Italy's post-war recovery and became, like the Vespa, an emblem of La Dolce Vita. The basic design was swiftly adopted by other manufacturers, and from the mid-1960s until the late 1980s the form was ubiquitous across Italy. In models sold by nearly all manufacturers, it dominated the bicycle market, in sizes scaled both down and up (with wheels as large as 24"). However, the 20" wheeled models predominated.

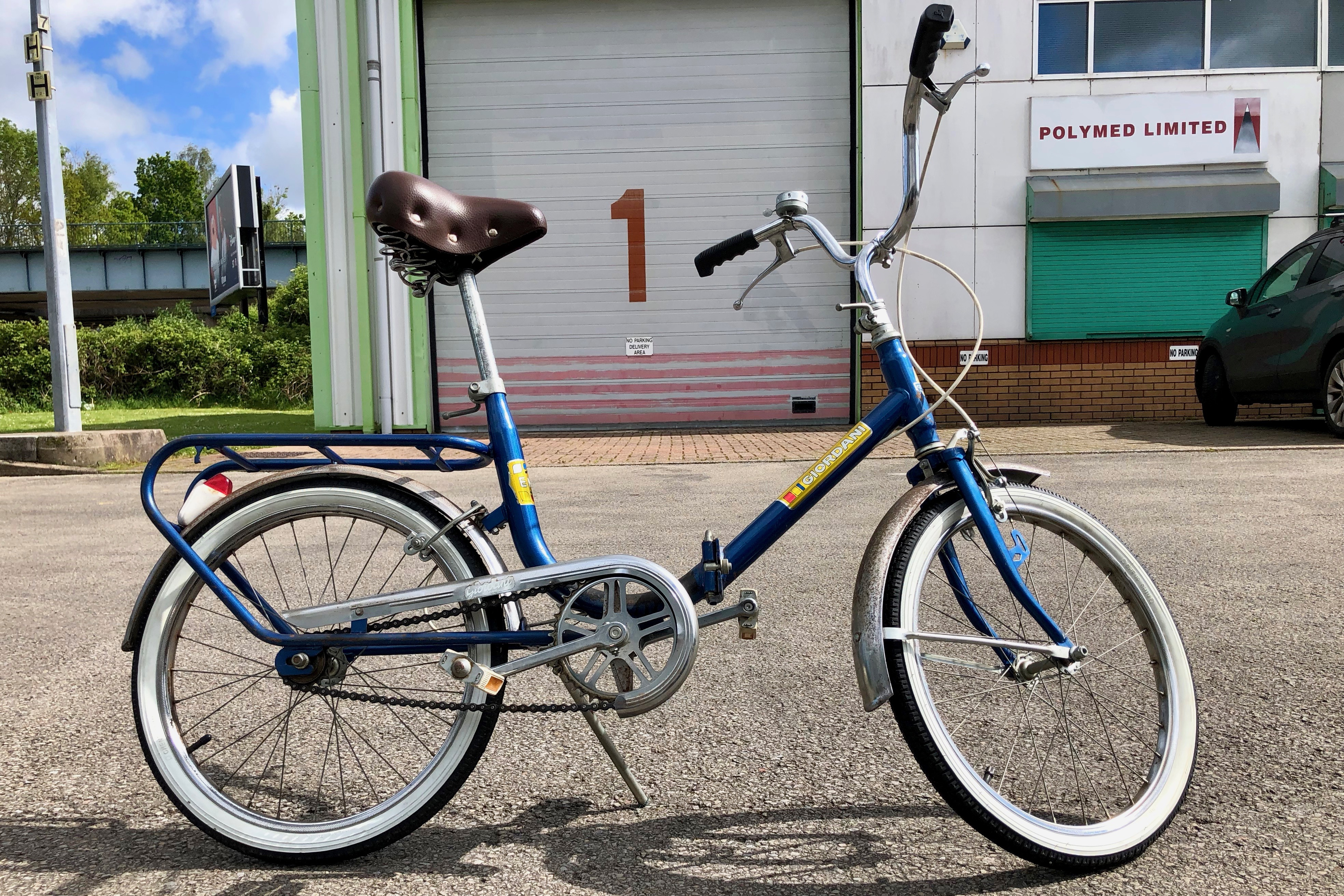

Advertising emphasised cycling as a fun and glamorous activity (rather than as a utilitarian mode of transport, or an arduous sport) and featured well-known personalities including Salvador Dalí and Brigitte Bardot. The sturdy rear rack of the Graziella form makes it easy to carry a passenger. Outside Italy, the Graziella design had less social impact; in Britain, for example, the form is referred to as a "shopper".
