= Simeon Vergnol =

French cyclist

Personal information
- Born: 18 February 1898
- Died: 8 August 1966 (aged 68)

Cycling career
- Sport: Cycling
- Discipline: Road
- Role: Rider

Simeon Vergnol (18 February 1898 – 8 August 1966) was a French racing cyclist. He rode in the 1925 Tour de France.
