= Auguste Pescher =

French cyclist

Personal information
- Born: 24 July 1899

Cycling career
- Sport: Cycling
- Discipline: Road
- Role: Rider

Auguste Pescher (born 24 July 1899, date of death unknown) was a French racing cyclist. He rode in the 1925 Tour de France.
