= Julien Perdaens =

Belgian cyclist

Personal information
- Born: 21 January 1903

Cycling career
- Sport: Cycling
- Discipline: Road
- Role: Rider

Julien Perdaens (born 21 January 1903, date of death unknown) was a Belgian racing cyclist. He rode in the 1925 Tour de France.
