= Joseph Berio =

French cyclist

Personal information
- Born: 14 June 1895
- Died: 1 May 1958 (aged 62)

Cycling career
- Sport: Cycling
- Discipline: Road
- Role: Rider

Joseph Berio (14 June 1895 – 1 May 1958) was a French racing cyclist. He rode in the 1925 Tour de France.
