= Ricardo Benasseni =

Italian cyclist

Personal information
- Born: 26 September 1890

Cycling career
- Sport: Cycling
- Discipline: Road
- Role: Rider

Ricardo Benasseni (born 26 September 1890, date of death unknown) was an Italian racing cyclist. He rode in the 1925 Tour de France.
