= Théo Bertholet =

Swiss cyclist

Personal information
- Born: 14 July 1896
- Died: 15 May 1971 (aged 74)

Cycling career
- Sport: Cycling
- Discipline: Road
- Role: Rider

Théo Bertholet (14 July 1896 – 15 May 1971) was a Swiss racing cyclist. He rode in the 1925 Tour de France.
