= Léon Avrillaud =

French cyclist

Personal information
- Born: 3 May 1901
- Died: 8 April 1971 (aged 69)

Cycling career
- Sport: Cycling
- Discipline: Road
- Role: Rider

Léon Avrillaud (3 May 1901 – 8 April 1971) was a French racing cyclist. He rode in the 1925 Tour de France.
