= Maxime Mourguiat =

French cyclist

Personal information
- Born: 29 October 1900
- Died: 10 January 1991 (aged 90)

Cycling career
- Sport: Cycling
- Discipline: Road
- Role: Rider

Maxime Mourguiat (29 October 1900 – 10 January 1991) was a French racing cyclist. He rode in the 1925 Tour de France.
