= Eugene Chiaberge =

French cyclist

Personal information
- Born: 9 April 1886
- Died: 21 May 1936 (aged 50)

Cycling career
- Sport: Cycling
- Discipline: Road
- Role: Rider

Eugene Chiaberge (9 April 1886 – 21 May 1936) was a French racing cyclist. He rode in the 1925 Tour de France.
