= Pietro Barrati =

Italian cyclist

Personal information
- Born: 28 October 1898

Cycling career
- Sport: Cycling
- Discipline: Road
- Role: Rider

Pietro Barrati (born 28 October 1898, date of death unknown) was an Italian racing cyclist. He rode in the 1925 Tour de France.
