= Urbain Comitis =

French cyclist

Personal information
- Born: 1900

Cycling career
- Sport: Cycling
- Discipline: Road
- Role: Rider

Urbain Comitis (born 1900, date of death unknown) was a French racing cyclist. He rode in the 1925 Tour de France.
