= Umberto Berni =

Italian cyclist

Personal information
- Born: 2 August 1900
- Died: 16 May 1945 (aged 44)

Cycling career
- Sport: Cycling
- Discipline: Road
- Role: Rider

Umberto Berni (2 August 1900 – 16 May 1945) was an Italian racing cyclist. He rode in the 1925 Tour de France.
