= Fernand Besnier =

French cyclist

Personal information
- Full name: Fernand Emile Henri Besnier
- Born: 27 March 1894 Courtomer, France
- Died: 7 February 1977 (aged 82) Paris, France

Cycling career
- Sport: Cycling
- Role: Rider

Fernand Besnier (27 March 1894 – 7 February 1977) was a French racing cyclist. He finished in last place in the 1925 Tour de France.
