= Bottecchia =

Italian bicycle manufacturing company

Coordinates: 45.1505946°N 12.0767839°E

Bottecchia Cicli S.r.l.
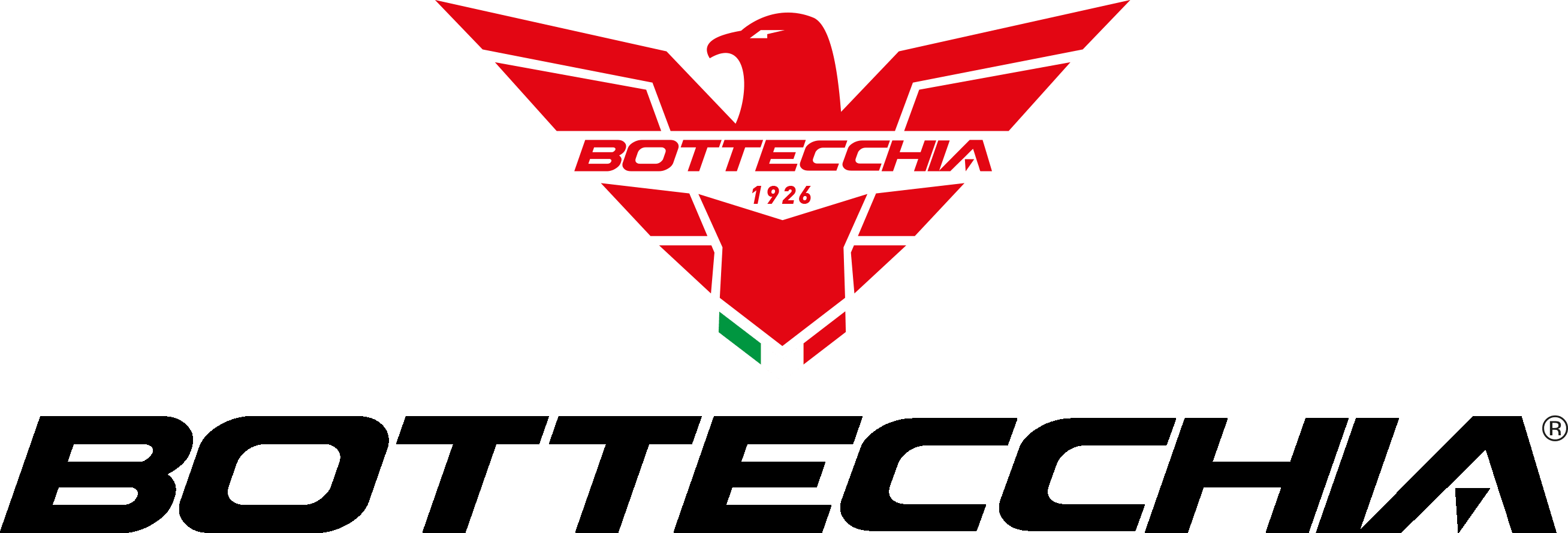
- Trade name: Bottecchia
- Type: Subsidiary
- Industry: Bicycle industry
- Founded: 1924; 102 years ago, Vittorio Veneto
- Founder: Ottavio Bottecchia
- Headquarters: V.le E. Ferrari 15/17 30014, Cavarzere, Italy
- Area served: Worldwide
- Products: Bicycles, E-bike and related components
- Parent: Fantic Motor
- Website: www.bottecchia.com

Bottecchia's former logo

Bottecchia Cicli S.r.l. is a bicycle manufacturing company headquartered in Cavarzere, Italy. They offer about 70 models that include road, mountain, trekking, city, BMX, folding, cyclo-cross, and electric. Some high-end frames are produced in Italy, the rest in Asia, and all the bikes are assembled in Italy. They have distribution in Europe, Australia, Japan, and the United States. They are the technical sponsor of the Androni-Sidermec-Bottecchia professional Italian team,

== History ==
Bottecchia is a historical bicycle company that started as a small cyclery of Carnielli and improved in 1924 by Ottavio Bottecchia. A new company with a new name "Bottecchia" was born after the death of Ottavio Bottecchia in 1926. In 1940 the work force of Bottecchia was 100 people and the company became an outstanding race firm with the historical name of Ottavio Bottecchia and under the management of the Carnielli family.

In 1951, Guido Carnielli, a son of the co-founder, built a wheel that could not fall over to facilitate rehabilitation for people with walking disabilities. He brought it under the name Cyclette (German: home trainer) on the market.

Over the years, the Bottecchia company has developed into one of the larger manufacturers of touring and racing bikes. In 2006, more than 50,000 Bottecchia bicycles were sold in Europe. They were the technical sponsor of the Acqua & Sapone professional Italian team, which rode the Giro d'Italia on Bottecchia SP9s in 2010 and on Bottecchia Emme 2s in 2011.

The company passed to the Carnielli family until 1999, when it was sold to some entrepreneurs who moved the headquarters to Cavarzere, in the Venetian area.

In July 2022 the company was bought by Fantic Motor.

== Bicycle manufacture ==
Until now Bottecchia makes a lot of race frames. The company also produces bikes for daily purposes and bicycle parts named "BTC" used only internally. The race profile of the company, is recently imported in the trekking line ("tempo libero") by offering a carbon trekking bike for daily use.

== Gallery ==
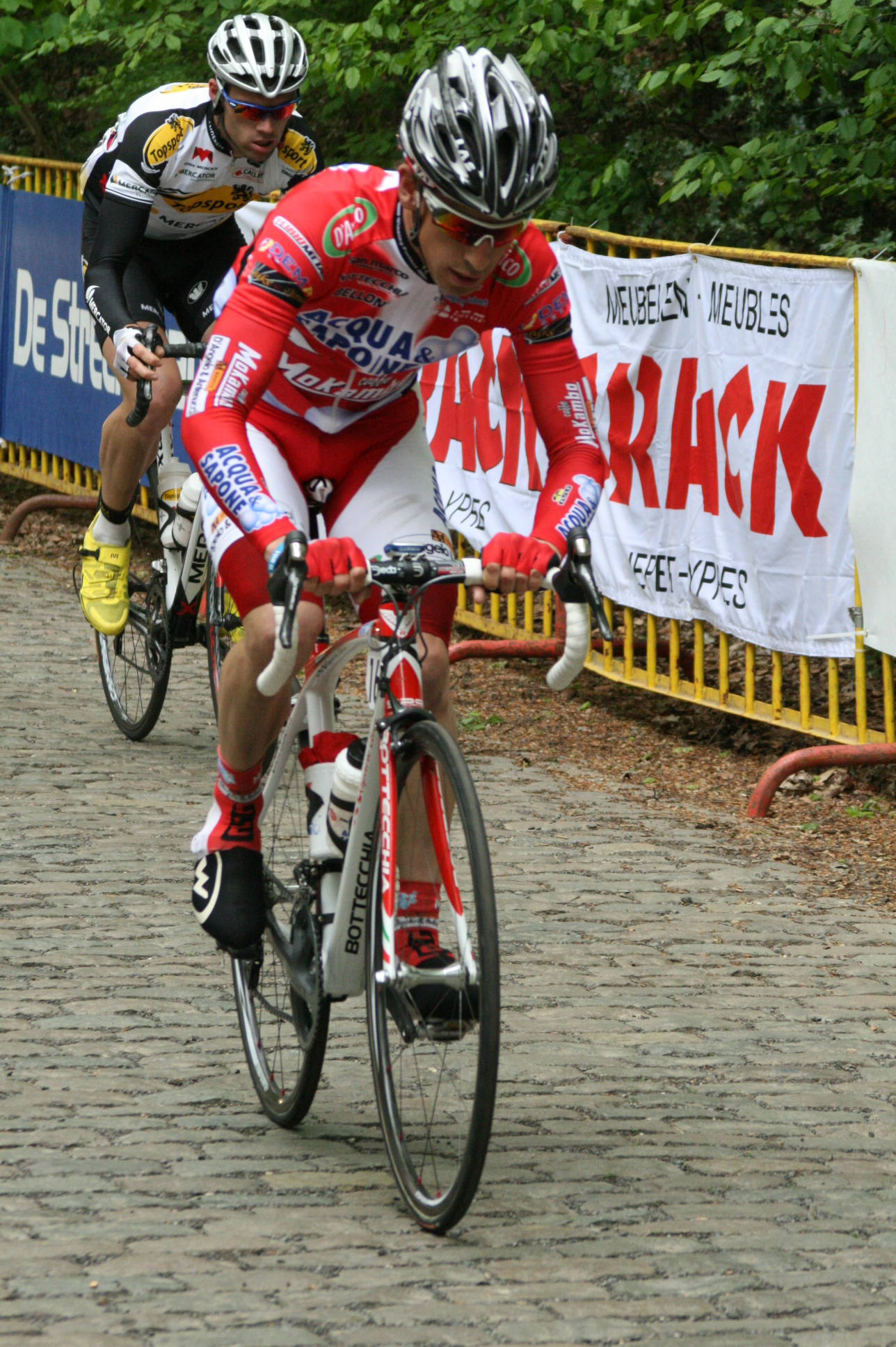
A Bottecchia model.

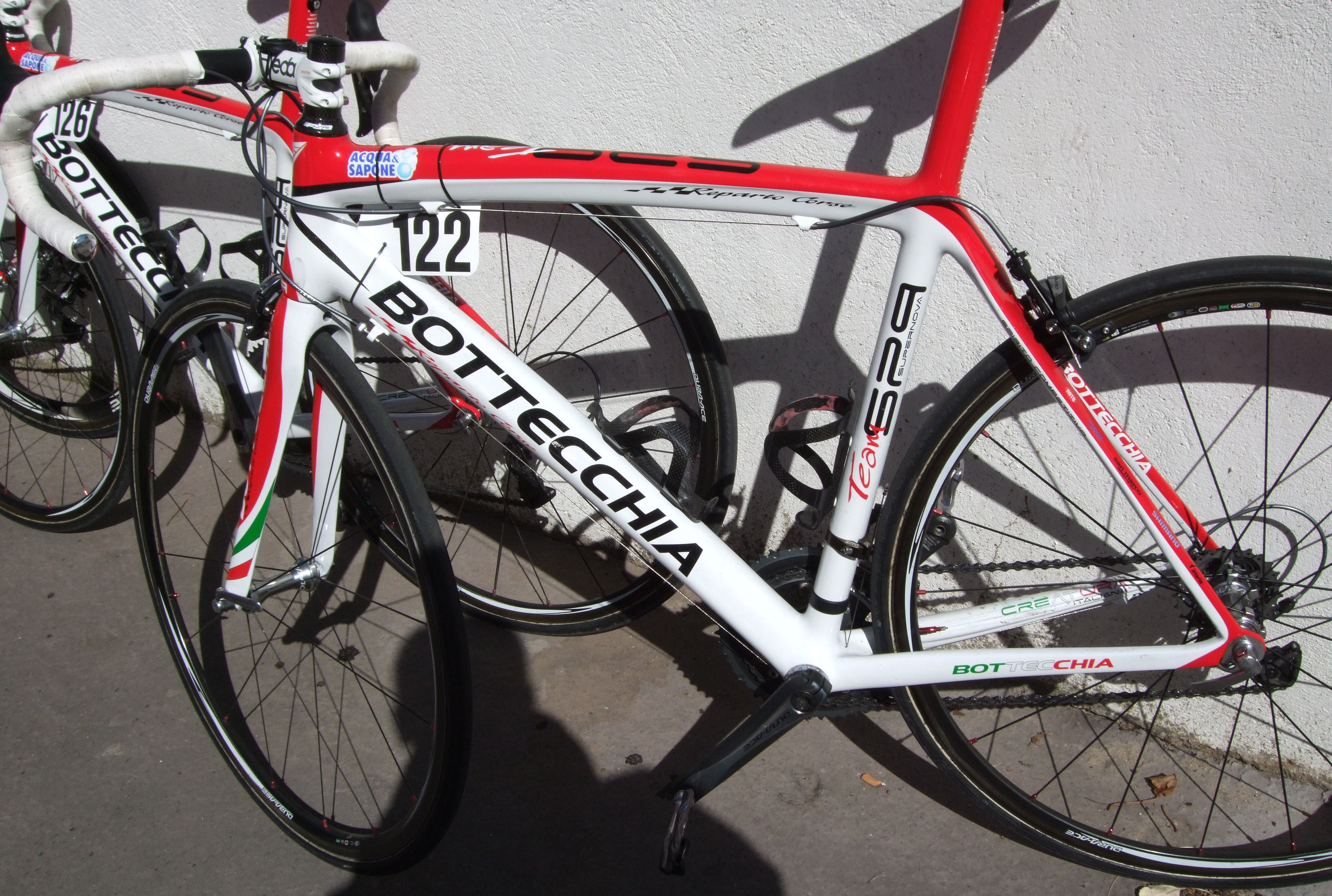
Bottecchia model from 2010.

== See also ==
- List of bicycle parts
- List of Italian companies
