= Arthur Targez =

Belgian cyclist

Personal information
- Born: 22 November 1896 Marche-les-Dames, Belgium
- Died: 30 December 1976 (aged 80) Marche-les-Dames, Belgium

Cycling career
- Sport: Cycling
- Discipline: Road
- Role: Rider

Arthur Targez (22 November 1896 – 30 December 1976) was a Belgian racing cyclist. He rode in the 1924 & 1925 Tour de France.
