= Auguste Verdyck =

Belgian cyclist

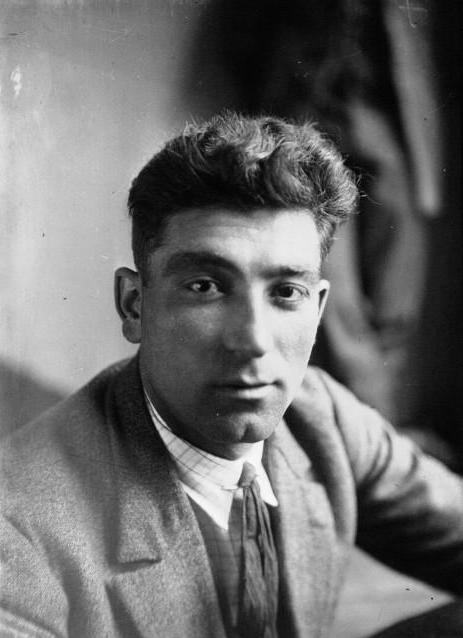

Personal information
- Born: 8 February 1902 Schoten, Belgium
- Died: 14 February 1988 (aged 86) Merksem, Belgium

Cycling career
- Sport: Cycling
- Discipline: Road
- Role: Rider

Professional teams
- 1925: Christophe–Hutchinson
- 1925–1926: Automoto–Hutchinson
- 1927: Christophe–Hutchinson
- 1929: Génial Lucifer–Hutchinson
- 1930: Dilecta–Wolber
- 1931–1933: Alcyon–Dunlop
- 1935: L'Express
- 1936: Van Hauwaert

Auguste Verdyck (8 February 1902 in Schoten – 14 February 1988 in Merksem) was a Belgian professional road bicycle racer. He was a professional from 1924 to 1939. His brother Lucien Verdijck was also a professional cyclist.

== Major results ==
1924
1st Paris–Nantes
2nd Schaal Sels
1925
1st Overall Tour of the Basque Country

1st Stage 3

1st Paris–Nantes
1st Stage 2 Critérium des Aiglons
2nd National Road Race Championships
3rd Overall Tour of Belgium

1st Stage 5

8th Overall Tour de France
1928
2nd National Cyclo-cross Championships
1932
2nd Nationale Sluitingprijs
3rd Scheldeprijs
