= Arthur Hendryckx =

Belgian cyclist

Personal information
- Born: 26 June 1891
- Died: 1977 (aged 85–86)

Cycling career
- Sport: Cycling
- Discipline: Road
- Role: Rider

Arthur Hendryckx (26 June 1891 – 1977) was a Belgian racing cyclist. He rode in the 1924 Tour de France.
