= Charles Roux (cyclist) =

French cyclist

Personal information
- Born: 22 April 1903
- Died: 15 February 1995 (aged 91)

Cycling career
- Sport: Cycling
- Discipline: Road
- Role: Rider

Charles Roux (22 April 1903 – 15 February 1995) was a French racing cyclist. He rode in the 1925 Tour de France.
