= Édouard Petre =

French cyclist

Personal information
- Born: 16 April 1895
- Died: 1 November 1936 (aged 41)

Cycling career
- Sport: Cycling
- Discipline: Road
- Role: Rider

Édouard Petre (16 April 1895 – 1 November 1936) was a French racing cyclist. He rode in the 1924 Tour de France.
