= Giovanni Canova (cyclist) =

Italian cyclist

Personal information
- Born: 28 August 1895
- Died: 7 September 1983 (aged 88)

Cycling career
- Sport: Cycling
- Discipline: Road
- Role: Rider

Giovanni Canova (28 August 1895 – 7 September 1983) was an Italian racing cyclist. He rode in the 1924 Tour de France.
