= Alfonso Piccin =

Italian cyclist

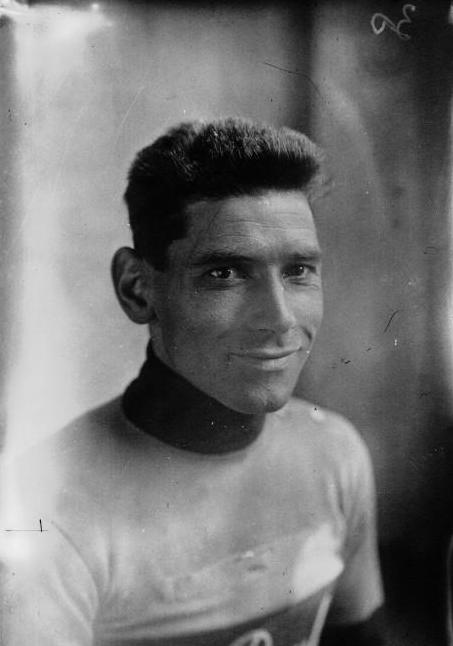

Personal information
- Born: 4 September 1901
- Died: 8 September 1932 (aged 31)

Cycling career
- Sport: Cycling
- Discipline: Road
- Role: Rider

Alfonso Piccin (4 September 1901 – 8 September 1932) was an Italian racing cyclist. He rode in the 1925 Tour de France.
