= Joseph Pé =

Belgian cyclist

- Joseph Pé in 1925

Personal information
- Born: 1 December 1891
- Died: 31 October 1980 (aged 88)

Cycling career
- Sport: Cycling
- Discipline: Road
- Role: Rider

Joseph Pé (1 December 1891 – 31 October 1980) was a Belgian racing cyclist. He rode in the 1924 Tour de France.
