= Arturo Bresciani =

Italian cyclist

Ardito Bresciani
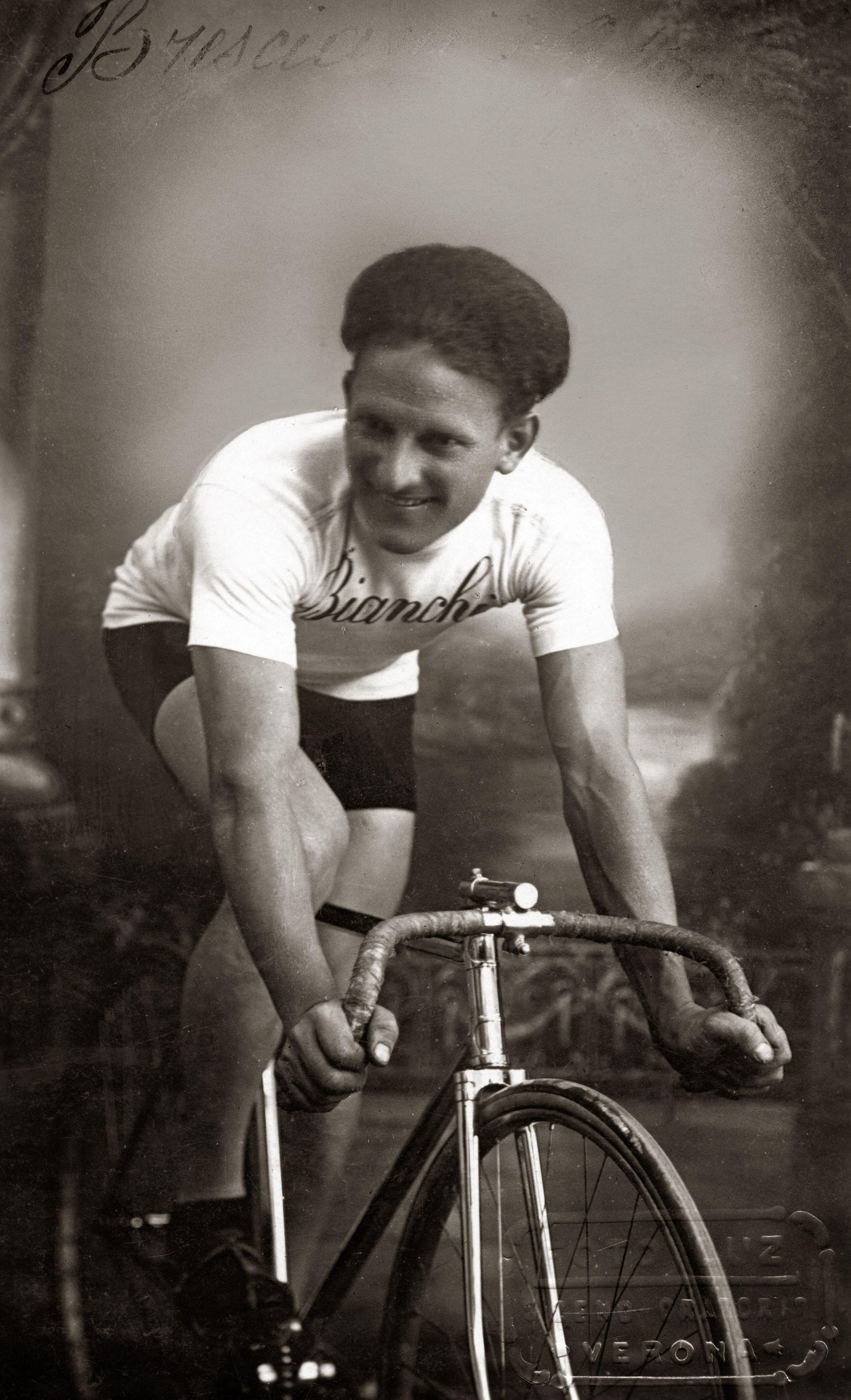

Personal information
- Born: 15 June 1899 Verona, Italy
- Died: 17 June 1948 (aged 49)

Cycling career
- Sport: Cycling

Arturo Bresciani (15 June 1899 – 17 June 1948) was an Italian cyclist. He competed in two events at the 1924 Summer Olympics. He also won stage 11 of the 1927 Giro d'Italia.
