= Adelin Benoît =

Belgian cyclist

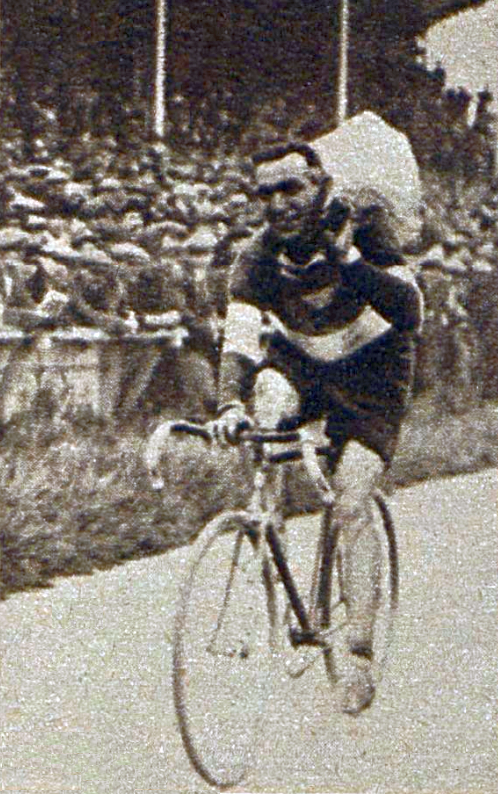

Personal information
- Full name: Adelin Benoît
- Born: 12 May 1900 Châtelet, Belgium
- Died: 18 June 1954 (aged 54) Châtelet, Belgium

Cycling career
- Sport: Cycling
- Current team: Retired
- Discipline: Road
- Role: Rider
- Rider type: Track-rider

Major wins
- Bordeaux–Paris 1926

Adelin Benoît (12 May 1900 – 18 June 1954) was a Belgian road racing cyclist, born in Châtelet. A surprising newcomer in the Tour de France in 1925, he wore the yellow jersey for 5 days, and won the stage in Luchon ("l'étape des quatre cols").

== Major results ==
1923
Belgium national amateur Road Race championship
1925
Tour de France:

winner 8th stage Bayonne - Luchon
holding the yellow jersey for 5 consecutive days

1926
Bordeaux–Paris
Tour de France:

winner 5th stage Le Havre - Cherbourg

1927
Tour de France:

winner 9th stage Les Sables d'Olonne - Bordeaux
winner 19th stage Evian - Pontarlier
