= Automoto (cycling team) =

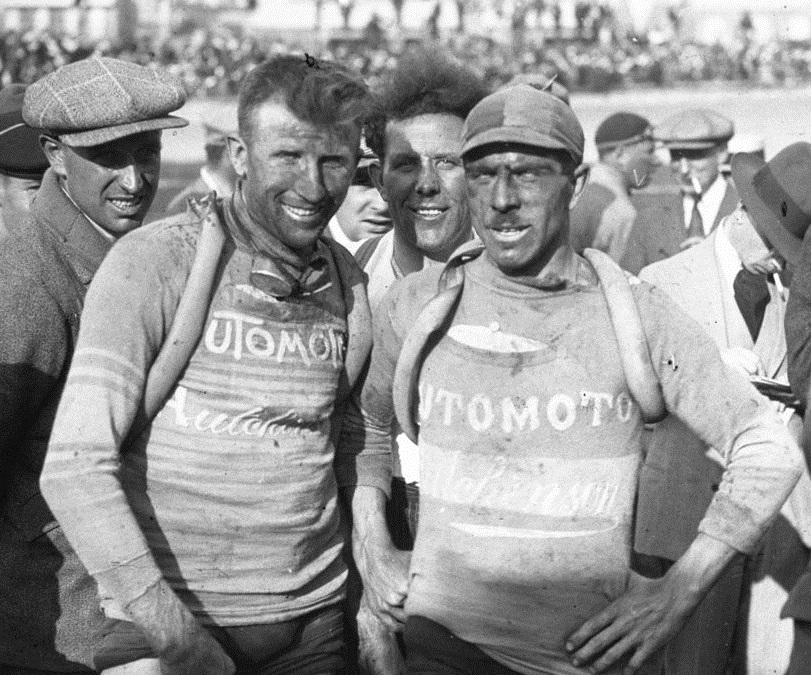
- Joseph Van Dam and Omer Huyse at the 1926 Tour de France

Team information
- Founded: 1910
- Disbanded: 1952
- Discipline: Road
- Bicycles: Automoto

Team name history
- 1910 1911 1912 1913–1914 1920 1922 1923 1924 1925–1926 1927–1929 1934 1949–1951 1952: Automoto; Automoto–Persan; Automoto; Automoto–Continental; Automoto; Automoto–Wolber–Russell Cycles; Automoto–Hutchinson; Automoto; Automoto–Hutchinson; Automoto; Automoto–Hutchinson; Automoto–Dunlop; Automoto

Automoto was a French professional cycling team that existed from 1910 to 1952. Its main sponsor was French bicycle and motorcycle manufacturer Automoto. The Automoto cycling team rose to its fullest prominence in the peloton after World War One. Its riders dominated professional cycling's premier event, the Tour de France, from 1923-1926 with a series of convincing victories captained by riders with international appeal like Henri Pellisier (France), Ottavio Bottecchia (Italy) and Lucien Buysse (Belgium).
