= Omer Huyse =

Belgian cyclist

Umer Huyse
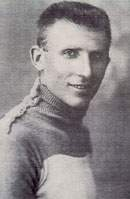

Personal information
- Full name: Umer Huyse
- Born: 22 August 1898 Kortrijk, Belgium
- Died: 2 March 1985 (aged 86)

Cycling career
- Sport: Cycling
- Discipline: Road
- Role: Rider

Major wins
- One stage Tour de France

Omer Huyse (22 August 1898 in Kortrijk – 2 March 1985 in Luingne) was a Belgian professional road bicycle racer. In 1924, he won stage five of the 1924 Tour de France.

== Major results ==
1923
Tour of Belgium for amateurs
Amsterdam
1924
Tour de France:

Winner stage 5
