= 1925 Tour de France =

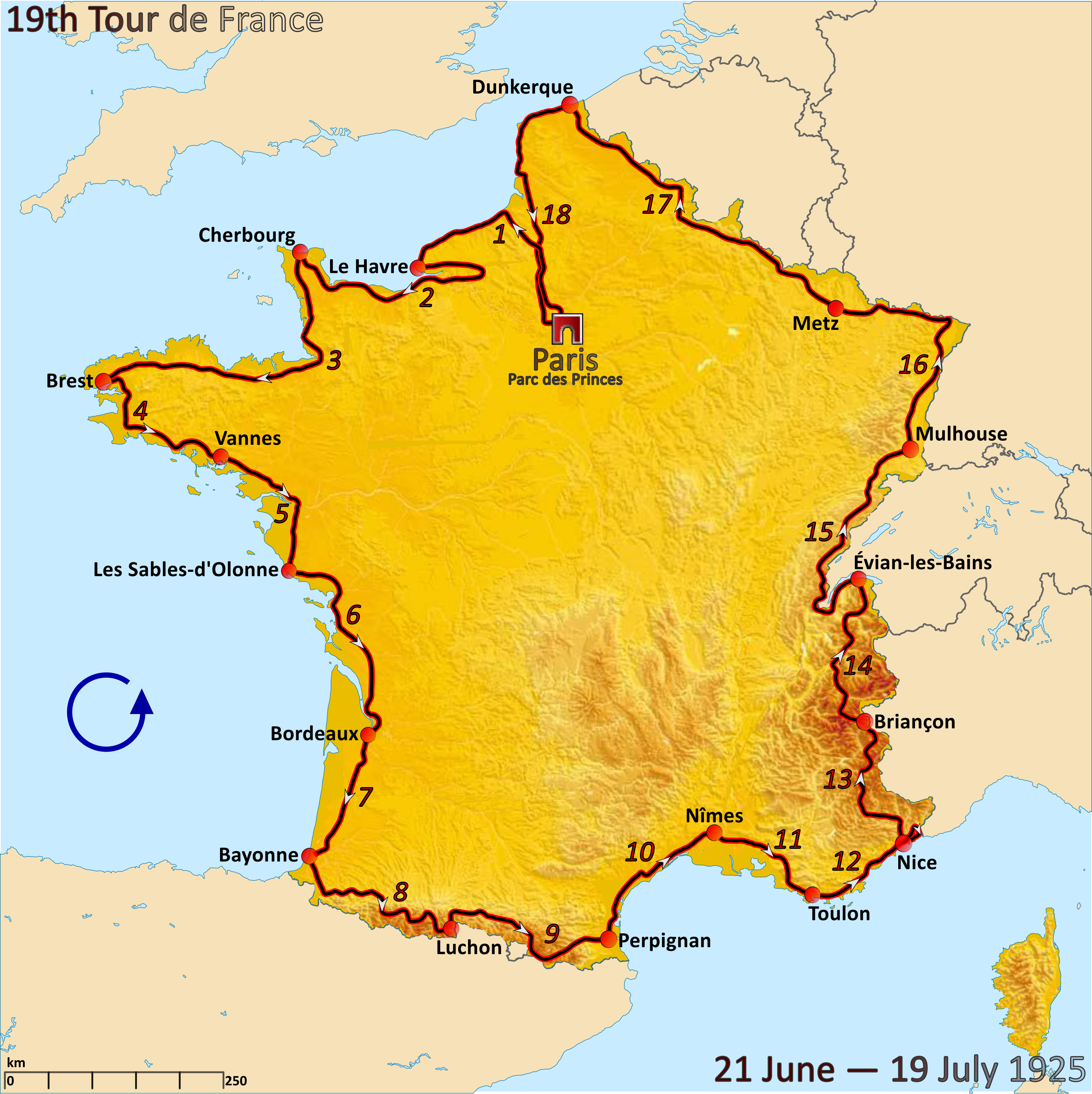
- Route of the 1925 Tour de France followed counterclockwise, starting in Paris

Race details
- Dates: 21 June – 19 July 1925
- Stages: 18
- Distance: 5,440 km (3,380 mi)
- Winning time: 219h 10' 18"

Results
Jersey awarded to the overall winner	Winner	Ottavio Bottecchia (ITA)	(Automoto)
	Second	Lucien Buysse (BEL)	(Automoto)
	Third	Bartoloméo Aymo (ITA)	(Alcyon)

The 1925 Tour de France was the 19th edition of the Tour de France. It was held from 21 June to 19 July, over 5,440 km (3,380 mi) in 18 stages. Italian Ottavio Bottecchia successfully defended his 1924 victory to win his second consecutive Tour. Only 49 of the 130 participants finished the course.

== Innovations and changes ==
In 1919 to 1924, the sponsored teams had been away because of the economic impact of World War I. In 1925, the teams returned.

For the first time, the Tour de France started outside Paris, in le Vésinet. The number of stages increased from 15, which had been used since 1910, to 18, thereby decreasing the average stage length.

The time bonus, given to the winner of a stage, was removed.

After Henri Pélissier had created a controversy by quitting the 1924 Tour de France and complaining on the toughness of the race to a journalist, the Tour organisation made a new rule that said that any rider that harmed the Tour's image would be banned for the next years.

== Teams ==
The participants were divided into two groups: 39 cyclists were riding in sponsored teams, and 91 rode as touriste-routiers. The teams did not have equal size; the largest team, J.B. Louvet, consisted of eight cyclists, while the smallest team, J.Alavoine-Dunlop, had only one cyclist, Jean Alavoine himself. There were 57 French, 34 Belgian, 28 Italian, 5 Swiss, 5 Luxembourgian and 1 Spanish cyclists.

== Race overview ==
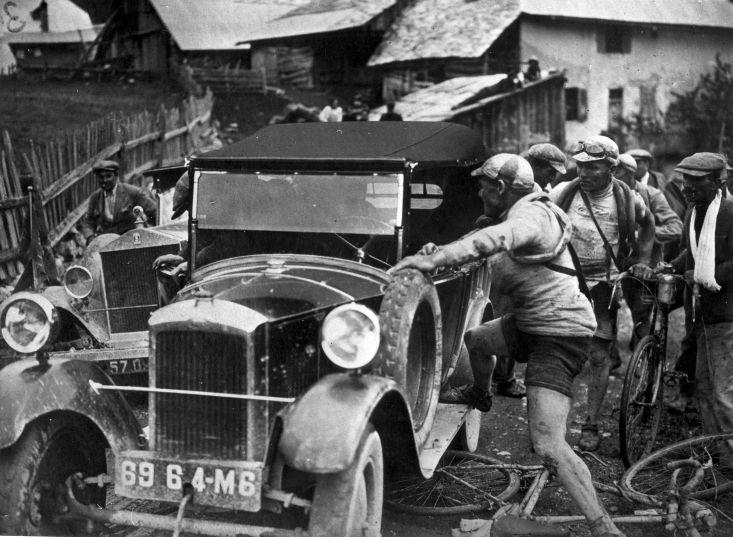
In the 13th stage, Felix Sellier was hit by a car. He continued without injuries, but can be seen angry in this photo.

Bottecchia, who had won the previous Tour de France, started by winning the first stage. In 1924, he had had no difficulty in defending his lead, but in 1925 there was Adelin Benoit, who surprisingly took over the lead in the third stage. Bottecchia was however only eight seconds behind in the general classification.

In the fourth stage, Henri Pélissier, the winner of the 1923 Tour de France, left the race. In previous years, Pélissier had left the race after a fight with tour organiser Henri Desgrange, but this time it was because of knee problems. In the sixth stage, Benoit punctured, and Bottechia's Automoto team rode as fast as they could to get away from Benoit. Bottecchia won the stage, and after he won the next stage too, he took over the lead.

In the eighth stage, Adelin Benoit won back eleven minutes in the first Pyrenees stage, in what used to be Bottecchia's specialty. In the ninth stage, Bottecchia took back the lead in the rain, and this decided the race. Bottecchia did not win the stage, but his Automoto teammates had helped him to win 45 minutes on Benoit. After that stage, Nicolas Frantz was number two, more than 13 minutes behind.

In the next stages, Bottecchia was helped by his teammate Lucien Buysse. In return, Bottecchia allowed Buysse to win the eleventh and twelfth stage. In the twelfth stage, Bottecchia and Buysse failed to sign in at a control post, and were fined with 10 minutes penalty time. Nonetheless, the margin with runner-up Frantz had increased to 27 minutes.

In the fourteenth stage, Frantz had a flat tyre, and the Automoto team raced away from him. Frantz lost more than 37 minutes. This took Frantz completely out of contention for the victory, and Bottecchia's victory seemed secure. Italian Aimo was the new runner-up, with a margin of more than 55 minutes. Lucien Buysse was only three minutes behind Aimo, and in the sixteenth stage, Buysse took off, trying to win back time on Aimo. Nicolas Frantz, Albert Dejonghe and Hector Martin followed him, but Aimo missed that move, and lost five minutes. Buysse was now in second place, with Frantz only three seconds behind him. In the seventeenth stage, Frantz missed the deciding escape, and Buysse and Aimo finished in the leading group, so Aimo was back in third place. Bottecchia made his Tour victory complete by winning the last stage.

== Results ==
In each stage, all cyclists started together. The cyclist who reached the finish first, was the winner of the stage. The time that each cyclist required to finish the stage was recorded. For the general classification, these times were added up; the cyclist with the least accumulated time was the race leader, identified by the yellow jersey.

=== Stage winners ===
Stage characteristics and winners
Stage	Date	Course	Distance	Type (Note: There was no distinction in the rules between plain stages and mountain stages; the icons shown here indicate which stages included mountains.)	Winner	Race leader
1	21 June	Paris to Le Havre	340 km (210 mi)	Plain stage	Ottavio Bottecchia (ITA)	Ottavio Bottecchia (ITA)
2	23 June	Le Havre to Cherbourg	371 km (231 mi)	Plain stage	Romain Bellenger (FRA)	Ottavio Bottecchia (ITA)
3	25 June	Cherbourg to Brest	405 km (252 mi)	Plain stage	Louis Mottiat (BEL)	Adelin Benoît (BEL)
4	26 June	Brest to Vannes	208 km (129 mi)	Plain stage	Nicolas Frantz (LUX)	Adelin Benoît (BEL)
5	27 June	Vannes to Les Sables-d'Olonne	204 km (127 mi)	Plain stage	Nicolas Frantz (LUX)	Adelin Benoît (BEL)
6	28 June	Les Sables-d'Olonne to Bordeaux	293 km (182 mi)	Plain stage	Ottavio Bottecchia (ITA)	Adelin Benoît (BEL)
7	29 June	Bordeaux to Bayonne	189 km (117 mi)	Plain stage	Ottavio Bottecchia (ITA)	Ottavio Bottecchia (ITA)
8	1 July	Bayonne to Luchon	326 km (203 mi)	Stage with mountain(s)	Adelin Benoît (BEL)	Adelin Benoît (BEL)
9	3 July	Luchon to Perpignan	323 km (201 mi)	Stage with mountain(s)	Nicolas Frantz (LUX)	Ottavio Bottecchia (ITA)
10	4 July	Perpignan to Nîmes	215 km (134 mi)	Plain stage	Theophile Beeckman (BEL)	Ottavio Bottecchia (ITA)
11	5 July	Nîmes to Toulon	215 km (134 mi)	Plain stage	Lucien Buysse (BEL)	Ottavio Bottecchia (ITA)
12	7 July	Toulon to Nice	280 km (170 mi)	Stage with mountain(s)	Lucien Buysse (BEL)	Ottavio Bottecchia (ITA)
13	9 July	Nice to Briançon	275 km (171 mi)	Stage with mountain(s)	Bartolomeo Aimo (ITA)	Ottavio Bottecchia (ITA)
14	11 July	Briançon to Evian	303 km (188 mi)	Stage with mountain(s)	Hector Martin (BEL)	Ottavio Bottecchia (ITA)
15	13 July	Evian to Mulhouse	373 km (232 mi)	Stage with mountain(s)	Nicolas Frantz (LUX)	Ottavio Bottecchia (ITA)
16	15 July	Mulhouse to Metz	334 km (208 mi)	Plain stage	Hector Martin (BEL)	Ottavio Bottecchia (ITA)
17	17 July	Metz to Dunkerque	433 km (269 mi)	Plain stage	Hector Martin (BEL)	Ottavio Bottecchia (ITA)
18	19 July	Dunkerque to Paris	343 km (213 mi)	Plain stage	Ottavio Bottecchia (ITA)	Ottavio Bottecchia (ITA)
	Total		5,440 km (3,380 mi)			

=== General classification ===
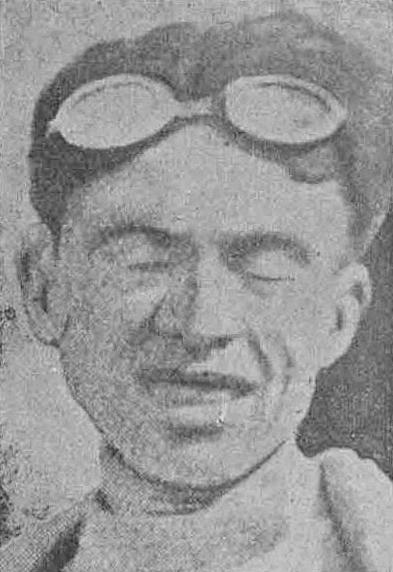
Ottavio Bottecchia, Tour de France 1925

In 1925, no French cyclist finished in the top ten. For the first time, two of the three riders on the podium were Italian.

Final general classification (1–10)
Rank	Rider	Sponsor	Time
1	Ottavio Bottecchia (ITA)	Automoto	219h 10' 18"
2	Lucien Buysse (BEL)	Automoto	+54' 20"
3	Bartolomeo Aimo (ITA)	Alcyon	+56' 37"
4	Nicolas Frantz (LUX)	Alcyon	+1h 11' 24"
5	Albert Dejonghe (BEL)	J.B. Louvet	+1h 27' 42"
6	Théophile Beeckman (BEL)	Thomann	+2h 24' 43"
7	Omer Huyse (BEL)	Armor	+2h 33' 38"
8	Auguste Verdyck (BEL)	Christophe	+2h 44' 36"
9	Félix Sellier (BEL)	Alcyon	+2h 45' 59"
10	Federico Gay (ITA)	Meteore	+4h 06' 03"

Final general classification (11–49)
Rank	Rider	Sponsor	Time
11	Romain Bellenger (FRA)	Alcyon	+4h 26' 10"
12	Adelin Benoit (BEL)	Thomann	+4h 37' 14"
13	Jean Alavoine (FRA)	J.Alavoine	+4h 39' 48"
14	Hector Martin (BEL)	J.B. Louvet	+4h 48' 44"
15	Jules Buysse (BEL)	Automoto	+5h 07' 33"
16	Léon Despontin (BEL)	Touriste	+5h 28' 07"
17	Emile Hardy (BEL)	Christophe	+6h 39' 01"
18	Eugène Christophe (FRA)	J.B. Louvet	+6h 55' 31"
19	Giovanni Rossignoli (ITA)	Touriste	+7h 18' 13"
20	Raymond Englebert (BEL)	Labor	+7h 30' 06"
21	Michele Gordini (ITA)	Touriste	+7h 31' 40"
22	Emile Masson Sr. (BEL)	Alcyon	+8h 55' 18"
23	Eugène Dhers (FRA)	Touriste	+9h 34' 16"
24	Henri Touzard (FRA)	Touriste	+9h 38' 06"
25	Alfonso Piccin (ITA)	Christophe	+9h 47' 24"
26	Angelo Gremo (ITA)	Meteore	+9h 55' 12"
27	Giovanni Canova (ITA)	Touriste	+10h 24' 50"
28	Arturo Bresciani (ITA)	Meteore	+10h 38' 43"
29	Charles Martinet (SUI)	Touriste	+11h 51' 53"
30	Maurice Arnoult (FRA)	Touriste	+12h 26' 04"
31	Louis Mottiat (BEL)	Alcyon	+13h 26' 54"
32	Mosé Arosio (ITA)	Touriste	+15h 23' 17"
33	Umberto Berni (ITA)	Touriste	+15h 49' 19"
34	Charles Roux (FRA)	Touriste	+15h 58' 38"
35	Alfons Standaert (BEL)	Labor	+16h 09' 19"
36	Vincenzo Bianco (ITA)	Touriste	+17h 12' 16"
37	Charles Loew (FRA)	Touriste	+19h 00' 10"
38	Antoine Riera (FRA)	Touriste	+19h 07' 32"
39	Henri Rubert (FRA)	Touriste	+20h 39' 31"
40	Charles Krier (LUX)	Touriste	+21h 20' 40"
41	Charles Cento (FRA)	Touriste	+23h 04' 54"
42	Roger Lacolle (FRA)	Meteore	+23h 32' 54"
43	Edouard Teisseire (FRA)	Touriste	+25h 22' 18"
44	Henri Miège (SUI)	Touriste	+25h 50' 56"
45	Edouard Petre (FRA)	Touriste	+27h 13' 41"
46	Lucien Prudhomme (FRA)	Touriste	+27h 17' 45"
47	Arthur Hendryckx (BEL)	Touriste	+30h 26' 16"
48	François Chevalier (FRA)	Touriste	+34h 24' 36"
49	Fernand Besnier (FRA)	Touriste	+36h 10' 50"

== Other classifications ==
The race for touriste-routiers, cyclists who did not belong to a team and were allowed no assistance, was won by Despontin.

The organing newspaper, l'Auto named a meilleur grimpeur (best climber), an unofficial precursor to the modern King of the Mountains competition. This award was won by Bottecchia.

== Aftermath ==
The 1925 Tour de France was Bottecchia's last great victory. In 1926 he started again, but withdrew in the Pyrenees. When he was training in 1927, he was found bleeding at the side of the road close to his house, and he died some hours later.

The champion of the 1923 Tour de France, Henri Pélissier, rode his last Tour de France in 1925.

During the race, Bottecchia had promised Lucien Buysse half his earnings, because he needed help. Buysse was content with this deal, and did not try to win the Tour himself. After the race ended, Buysse told his relatives that he was happy with how things went, but that the next year he would try and win the race, which he did.

== Bibliography ==
- Augendre, Jacques (2016). "Guide historique" [Historical guide] (PDF). Tour de France (in French). Paris: Amaury Sport Organisation. Archived (PDF) from the original on 17 August 2016.
- Dauncey, Hugh; Hare, Geoff (2003). The Tour de France, 1903–2003: A Century of Sporting Structures, Meanings and Values. London: Frank Cass & Co. ISBN 978-0-203-50241-9.
- McGann, Bill; McGann, Carol (2006). The Story of the Tour de France: 1903–1964. Vol. 1. Indianapolis, IN: Dog Ear Publishing. ISBN 978-1-59858-180-5.
