= List of cyclists in the 1923 Tour de France =

List of cyclists

In previous years, the cyclists had been divided in two classes, the sponsored class and the unsponsored class. For the 1923 Tour de France, this system changed, and three categories were used: the "first category", of the top cyclist, the "second category", of lesser but still sponsored cyclists, and the touriste-routiers, the quasi-amateurs.

The sponsors, who had joined forces in the previous tours under the name La Sportive, were now financially stable enough to have their own teams. Automoto, sponsor of the team with the Pélissier brothers, had commercial interests in Italy, so wanted to have Italian cyclists in the team. Several Italian cyclists were hired, who were supposed to come to France. Only one Italian cyclist showed up, Ottavio Bottecchia, who had started as a professional the year before. The sponsor then decided that the marketing plan would not work with only one Italian cyclist, and wanted to send him back. At the last minute, Bottecchia was allowed to stay on the team.

== By starting number ==
Legend
No.	Starting number worn by the rider during the Tour
Pos.	Position in the general classification
DNF	Denotes a rider who did not finish

No.	Name	Nationality	Pos.	Ref
1	Firmin Lambot	Belgium	DNF	
2	Robert Jacquinot	France	25	
4	Jean Alavoine	France	DNF	
5	Romain Bellenger	France	3	
6	Hector Tiberghien	Belgium	4	
7	Gaston Degy	France	16	
8	Léon Despontin	Belgium	7	
9	Robert Reboul	France	DNF	
10	Joseph Muller	France	11	
11	Louis Mottiat	Belgium	28	
12	Félix Sellier	Belgium	DNF	
14	Albert Dejonghe	Belgium	DNF	
15	Philippe Thys	Belgium	DNF	
16	Léon Scieur	Belgium	DNF	
17	Jean Rossius	Belgium	DNF	
18	Théophile Beeckman	Belgium	14	
19	Marcel Huot	France	10	
20	Honoré Barthélémy	France	DNF	
21	Hector Heusghem	Belgium	DNF	
22	Victor Leenaerts	Belgium	DNF	
23	Henri Pélissier	France	1	
24	Francis Pélissier	France	23	
25	Lucien Buysse	Belgium	8	
26	Ottavio Bottecchia	Italy	2	
27	Giuseppe Santhià	Italy	DNF	
29	Félix Goethals	France	13	
30	Arsène Alancourt	France	5	
31	Laurent Seret	Belgium	DNF	
32	Paul Deman	Belgium	DNF	
101	Eugène Dhers	France	9	
102	Henri Collé	Switzerland	6	
103	Marcel Godard	France	DNF	
104	Georges Cuvelier	France	20	
105	Roger Lacolle	France	DNF	
106	Carlo Longoni	Italy	26	
107	Lucien Rich	France	17	
108	Benjamin Mortier	Belgium	21	
109	Fernand Moulet	France	DNF	
110	Robert Gerbaud	France	DNF	
111	Joseph Curtel	France	DNF	
112	Joseph Normand	France	15	
113	Joseph Van Daele	Belgium	DNF	
114	Alfons Standaert	Belgium	22	
116	Joseph Marchand	Belgium	DNF	
117	Alfred Debusscher	Belgium	DNF	
118	Achille Depauw	Belgium	DNF	
119	Karel Govaert	Belgium	DNF	
120	Léon Van Aken	Belgium	DNF	
121	Camille Leroy	Belgium	DNF	
123	André Desbordes	France	DNF	
124	Camille Nicou	France	DNF	
125	Roger Iriart	France	DNF	
126	Paul Duboc	France	18	
201	Marcel Robin	France	DNF	
202	Lucien Lagouche	France	DNF	
203	Joseph Bercegeay	France	DNF	
204	Marcel Vernant	France	DNF	
205	Giuseppe Ercolani	Italy	41	
206	Lucien Roquebert	France	DNF	
207	Charles Loew	France	36	
208	Eugène Nicolle	France	DNF	
209	Georges Dauphin	France	DNF	
210	Henri Timmermann	Belgium	DNF	
211	Alexandre Baud	France	DNF	
212	Jean Grousset	France	DNF	
214	Célestin Rouget	France	DNF	
215	Pierre Gilbert	France	DNF	
216	Marcel Simonet	France	46	
217	Daniel Masson	France	48	
218	André Andresse	France	DNF	
219	Emile Bonnefoi	France	DNF	
220	Camille Botte	Belgium	19	
221	Giovanni Bai	Italy	DNF	
224	François Chevalier	France	DNF	
225	Adrien Alpini	France	DNF	
226	Pietro Casati	Italy	DNF	
227	Maurice Langrenais	France	DNF	
228	Adrien-Robert Toussaint	France	DNF	
229	Paul Denis	France	37	
230	Louis Verbraecken	Belgium	DNF	
231	Felix Richard	France	38	
232	Henri Catelan	France	DNF	
233	Emile Kass	France	DNF	
234	André Robustel	France	DNF	
235	Silvio Borsetti	Italy	DNF	
236	Albert Colbec	France	DNF	
237	Pierre Hudsyn	Belgium	30	
238	Georges Kamm	France	44	
239	Charles Parel	Switzerland	27	
240	Joseph Douard	France	DNF	
241	Jean Kienlen	France	40	
242	Jules Brun	France	DNF	
245	Oscar Barselotti	France	DNF	
246	Charles Budts	Belgium	DNF	
247	Clotaire Guillon	France	DNF	
248	Ernest Schiavo	Switzerland	DNF	
250	Antoine Rière	France	32	
252	Maurice Arnoult	France	35	
253	Vincenzo Bianco	Italy	43	
254	Joseph Rayen	France	DNF	
255	Ange-Marie Aubry	France	DNF	
256	Henri Miege	Switzerland	39	
257	Maurice Laine	France	DNF	
258	Maurive Protin	Belgium	47	
259	Fernand Durieux	France	DNF	
260	Louis Marty	France	DNF	
261	François Picolot	France	DNF	
263	Pietro Fasoli	Italy	DNF	
264	Jean Hautot	France	DNF	
265	Jules Deloffre	France	DNF	
266	Pierre Faillu	France	DNF	
267	Robert Fournier	France	DNF	
269	Edgard Roy	France	31	
270	Jules Vertriest	Belgium	DNF	
271	Louis Alais	France	DNF	
272	Maurice Guenot	France	DNF	
273	André Coutte	France	DNF	
274	Marcel Allain	France	DNF	
275	Alfred Hersard	France	42	
277	Georges Tufeny	France	DNF	
278	Octave Hie	France	DNF	
280	Victoriano Otero	Spain	DNF	
281	Jean Pennaneach	France	DNF	
282	Vincenzo Mantelli	Italy	DNF	
283	Andrea Cornelio	France	DNF	
284	Louis Lemitere	France	DNF	
285	Julien Noth	France	DNF	
286	Jules Nempon	France	DNF	
288	Charles Hennuyer	France	DNF	
289	Charles Arnulf	France	45	
290	Louis Budts	Belgium	DNF	
291	Eugène Leveille	France	DNF	
292	Henri Touzard	France	24	
293	Robert Asse	France	DNF	
294	Luigi Vertemati	Italy	DNF	
295	Charles Cento	France	34	
297	Giuseppe Ruffoni	Italy	33	
299	Ottavio Pratesi	Italy	12	
301	Giovanni Rossignoli	Italy	29	
