= List of cyclists in the 1922 Tour de France =

List of cyclists

For the 1922 Tour de France, although World War I was already a few years ago, its economic impact was not yet over. The cycling companies were still not able to sponsor the cyclists in the way they did before the war, so as in 1919, 1920 and 1921 they bundled their forces under the nick La Sportive. The cyclists were divided in two categories, this time named 1ère classe (first class), the professionals, and 2ème classe (second class), the amateurs.

The French cyclists Henri and Francis Pélissier had stopped the 1920 Tour de France after Henri received a penalty from the Tour organisation for throwing away a tire. For this reason, the Pélissier brothers did not start in the 1921 and 1922 Tours.

== By starting number ==
Legend
No.	Starting number worn by the rider during the Tour
Pos.	Position in the general classification
DNF	Denotes a rider who did not finish

No.	Name	Nationality	Pos.	Ref
1	Léon Scieur	Belgium	DNF	
2	Jean Rossius	Belgium	9	
3	Félix Goethals	France	DNF	
4	Robert Grassin	France	DNF	
5	Eugène Christophe	France	8	
6	Honoré Barthélémy	France	DNF	
8	Victor Lenaers	Belgium	5	
9	Jean Alavoine	France	2	
10	Romain Bellenger	France	DNF	
11	Robert Jacquinot	France	DNF	
12	Hector Tiberghien	Belgium	6	
13	Firmin Lambot	Belgium	1	
14	Léon Depontin	Belgium	7	
15	Philippe Thys	Belgium	14	
16	Eugène Dhers	France	DNF	
17	Gaston Degy	France	10	
18	Louis Heusghem	Belgium	19	
19	Joseph Muller	France	16	
21	Émile Masson	Belgium	12	
22	Félix Sellier	Belgium	3	
23	Hector Heusghem	Belgium	4	
24	Joseph Van Daele	Belgium	DNF	
25	Albert Dejonghe	Belgium	DNF	
26	Angelo Gremo	Italy	DNF	
27	Federico Gay	Italy	11	
28	Arsène Alancourt	France	13	
101	Eugène Forestier	France	DNF	
103	Georges Nemo	Belgium	DNF	
104	Henri Catelan	France	DNF	
105	Edgard Roy	France	22	
106	Henri Miege	Switzerland	DNF	
107	Fernand Braeckman	Belgium	DNF	
108	Jules Lebreton	France	DNF	
109	Adolphe Villaux	Belgium	DNF	
110	José Pelletier	France	15	
111	Lucien Abbe	France	DNF	
112	François Colomines	France	DNF	
113	Antoine Riere	France	DNF	
114	Charles Pavese	France	DNF	
115	Noël Amenc	France	DNF	
116	René Wendels	Belgium	DNF	
117	Joseph Rasqui	Luxembourg	DNF	
118	Eugène Nicolle	France	DNF	
120	Adrien Alpini	France	DNF	
121	Emanuele Luigi	Italy	34	
122	Robert Beaulieu	France	DNF	
123	Charles Raboisson	France	DNF	
124	Jules Nempon	France	20	
125	Laurent Devalle	Monaco	35	
126	Silvio Borsetti	Italy	DNF	
127	Georges Kamm	France	31	
128	Émile Desterbecq	Belgium	DNF	
129	Henri Hanlet	Belgium	DNF	
130	Gaston Van Waesberghe	Belgium	DNF	
131	Guillaume Nyssen	Belgium	DNF	
132	Georges Hautin	France	DNF	
133	Roger Marye	France	DNF	
134	Edmond Pertusot	France	DNF	
135	Jacques Carette	France	DNF	
136	Maurice Charreire	France	DNF	
137	Henri Martin	France	DNF	
138	Fernand Combes	France	DNF	
139	Marcel Thoreau	France	DNF	
140	Marcel Brunie	France	DNF	
142	Louis Léonce	France	DNF	
143	Vincenzo Bianco	Italy	DNF	
144	François Chevalier	France	DNF	
145	Henri Jacob	France	DNF	
147	Alfred Hersard	France	DNF	
149	Joseph Rayen	France	DNF	
150	André Zonnequin	France	DNF	
151	Charles Hennuyer	France	37	
152	Didier Meslard	France	DNF	
153	Camille Botte	Belgium	DNF	
154	André Chazeau	France	DNF	
155	Auguste Meyer	France	DNF	
156	Jules Brun	France	33	
157	Jean Kienlen	France	DNF	
158	Henri Yvon	France	DNF	
159	René Sal	France	DNF	
160	Robert Constantin	France	36	
161	Ange-Marie Aubry	France	29	
162	Lauro Bordin	Italy	DNF	
163	Charles Parel	Switzerland	27	
164	Léon Van Aken	Belgium	28	
165	Joseph Marchand	Belgium	23	
166	Théophile Beeckman	Belgium	18	
167	Camille Leroy	Belgium	DNF	
168	Jules-Richard Matton	Belgium	25	
169	Charles Loew	France	32	
170	Robert Asse	France	DNF	
171	Léon Poncelet	France	DNF	
172	Paul Denis	France	DNF	
173	Jean Archelais	France	DNF	
174	Auguste Berthault	France	DNF	
175	Alfred De Busschere	Belgium	DNF	
176	Clotaire Guillon	France	DNF	
177	Raoul Boucher	France	DNF	
178	Pierre Hudsyn	Belgium	26	
179	Daniel Masson	France	38	
180	Jean Benot	France	DNF	
181	Albert Rousselle	France	DNF	
182	Victor Guichon	France	DNF	
183	Julien Noth	France	DNF	
184	Ernest Paul	France	30	
186	Hilaire Hellebaut	Belgium	DNF	
187	Alfons Standaert	Belgium	21	
188	Henri De Jaegher	Belgium	DNF	
189	Léon Braeckeveldt	Belgium	DNF	
190	Giuseppe Santhià	Italy	17	
191	Luigi Vertemati	Italy	DNF	
192	Evaristo Endanco	Italy	DNF	
193	Lorenzo Costa	Italy	DNF	
195	Emile Lejeune	France	DNF	
196	Maurice Guenot	France	DNF	
197	Georges Davoine	France	DNF	
202	Lucien Lagouche	France	DNF	
203	Alexandre Dupontreue	France	DNF	
207	Angelo Erba	Italy	DNF	
208	Enrico Sala	Italy	24	
