= List of cyclists in the 1924 Tour de France =

List of cyclists

Entrants to the 1924 Tour de France included several past and future winners such as defending champion Henri Pélissier (1923), Philippe Thys (1913, 1914, 1920), Lucien Buysse (1926) and Nicolas Frantz (1927, 1928).

After the 1923 Tour de France, the winner Henri Pélissier had said that the runner-up Bottecchia would win the race.

== By starting number ==
Legend
No.	Starting number worn by the rider during the Tour
Pos.	Position in the general classification
DNF	Denotes a rider who did not finish

No.	Name	Nationality	Pos.	Ref
1	Henri Pélissier	France	DNF	
2	Ottavio Bottecchia	Italy	1	
3	Francis Pélissier	France	DNF	
4	Maurice Ville	France	DNF	
5	Achille Souchard	France	DNF	
6	Henri Collé	Switzerland	DNF	
7	Lucien Buysse	Belgium	3	
8	Félix Sellier	Belgium	DNF	
9	Émile Masson	Belgium	DNF	
10	Louis Mottiat	Belgium	18	
11	Pierre Bachellerie	France	DNF	
12	Raymond Englebert	Belgium	16	
13	Jean Alavoine	France	14	
14	Romain Bellenger	France	8	
15	Philippe Thys	Belgium	11	
16	Robert Jacquinot	France	DNF	
17	Firmin Lambot	Belgium	DNF	
18	Joseph Muller	France	6	
19	Hector Tiberghien	Belgium	10	
21	Marcel Huot	France	DNF	
22	Joseph Curtel	France	DNF	
23	René Gérard	France	DNF	
24	Adolf Van Bruane	Belgium	DNF	
25	Lucien Rich	France	20	
26	Victor Fontan	France	DNF	
27	Albert Dejonghe	Belgium	DNF	
28	Honoré Barthélémy	France	DNF	
29	Hector Heusghem	Belgium	DNF	
30	Victor Leenaerts	Belgium	DNF	
31	Bartolomeo Aimo	Italy	4	
32	Giovanni Brunero	Italy	DNF	
33	Giuseppe Enrici	Italy	DNF	
34	Arturo Ferrario	Italy	DNF	
35	Ermanno Vallazza	Italy	13	
36	Théophile Beeckman	Belgium	5	
37	Georges Cuvelier	France	12	
38	Arsène Alancourt	France	7	
40	Gérard Debaets	Belgium	DNF	
41	Jules Huyvaert	Belgium	DNF	
42	Nicolas Frantz	Luxembourg	2	
43	Léon Scieur	Belgium	DNF	
44	Adelin Benoît	Belgium	DNF	
45	Félix Goethals	France	25	
101	Gaston Degy	France	15	
102	Léon Despontin	Belgium	DNF	
103	Alfons Van Hecke	Belgium	DNF	
104	Joseph Normand	France	DNF	
105	Odile Defraye	Belgium	DNF	
106	Alfons Standaert	Belgium	17	
107	Marcel Gobillot	France	DNF	
109	Eugène Dhers	France	23	
110	Fernand Lemay	France	DNF	
111	Omer Huyse	Belgium	9	
112	Emile Hardy	Belgium	21	
131	Louis Richert	France	DNF	
201	François Chevalier	France	58	
203	Henri Touzard	France	22	
205	Auguste Lesigne	France	DNF	
207	Jean Garby	France	39	
208	Henri Miege	France	56	
209	Giuseppe Ercolani	Italy	DNF	
210	Antoine Riere	France	37	
212	Albert Desmet	France	DNF	
213	Charles Loew	France	DNF	
214	François Brient	France	DNF	
215	Charles Cento	France	29	
216	Joseph Douard	France	DNF	
217	Victorino Otero	Spain	42	
218	René Wendels	Belgium	27	
219	Maurice Arnoult	France	26	
220	Robert Loret	France	43	
221	Charles Parel	Switzerland	28	
222	Gottfried Burgat	Switzerland	DNF	
223	Marceau Lardenois	France	DNF	
224	René Billing	France	DNF	
225	Ange-Marie Aubry	France	32	
226	Louis Le Goaer	France	DNF	
227	Victor Lafosse	France	60	
228	Jean Majérus	Luxembourg	DNF	
229	Alexandre Baud	France	DNF	
230	Joseph Cassini	Italy	DNF	
231	Felix Richard	France	44	
232	François Petitjean	France	DNF	
233	Umberto Ripamonti	Italy	DNF	
234	Angelo Erba	Italy	41	
235	Emile Broussard	France	DNF	
236	Henri Rubert	France	46	
238	Louis Millo	France	59	
239	Giovanni Rossignoli	Italy	33	
240	Adrien Alpini	France	DNF	
241	Charles Arnulf	France	DNF	
243	Joseph Bercegeay	France	DNF	
244	Maurice Guenot	France	DNF	
245	Fernand Bozzo	France	DNF	
246	Jean Martinet	Switzerland	34	
247	Henri Texereau	France	DNF	
248	Charles Draon	France	DNF	
249	Henri Catelan	France	40	
250	Paul Denis	France	38	
251	Petrus Everaert	Belgium	DNF	
252	André Pompon	France	DNF	
253	Maurice Protin	Belgium	48	
254	Alfred Hersard	France	54	
255	Daniel Masson	France	DNF	
256	Jaime Janer	Spain	30	
257	Ottavio Pratesi	Italy	19	
258	Clotaire Guillon	France	DNF	
259	Luigi Brambilla	Italy	DNF	
260	Colombo Gallorini	Italy	DNF	
261	Camille Botte	Belgium	DNF	
262	Jules Bertrand	France	DNF	
263	Jean Pennaneach	France	DNF	
264	Giuseppe Cassanti	Italy	DNF	
265	Henri Ferrara	France	24	
266	Arthur Hendryckx	Belgium	DNF	
267	Lucien Prudhomme	France	51	
268	Augusto Rho	Italy	52	
269	Jean Archelais	France	DNF	
270	Emanuele Luigi	Italy	47	
271	Léopold Gelot	France	DNF	
272	Jacques Pfister	France	DNF	
274	Emile Dalifard	France	DNF	
275	Alfred Noullez	France	DNF	
277	Edouard Petre	France	DNF	
278	Cyriel Omey	Belgium	DNF	
279	Ernest Langlais	France	DNF	
280	Adrien Toussaint	France	57	
281	Albert Boutinet	France	DNF	
282	Guido Oddone	Italy	DNF	
284	Mosé Arosio	France	50	
285	Felice Di Gaetano	Italy	53	
287	Jules Banino	France	DNF	
288	Laurent Devalle	Monaco	55	
289	Léon Robelin	France	DNF	
290	Luigi Ugaglia	Italy	DNF	
291	Alexandre Bontoux	France	DNF	
293	Georges Decultot	France	DNF	
294	Marcel Robin	France	DNF	
295	Jules Nempon	France	DNF	
296	Albert Rousselle	France	DNF	
298	Vincenzo Bianco	Italy	45	
300	Giuseppe Ruffoni	Italy	31	
301	Arthur Targez	Belgium	DNF	
302	Luigi Vertemati	Italy	36	
303	Giovanni Canova	Italy	DNF	
307	Jean Belvaux	Belgium	DNF	
310	Georges Kamm	France	49	
311	Pasquale Di Pietro	Italy	DNF	
312	Pietro Fasoli	Italy	DNF	
313	Pietro Pistone	Italy	DNF	
315	Joseph Pé	Belgium	DNF	
317	Albert Buisson	France	DNF	
318	Giuseppe Brenna	Italy	DNF	
321	Enrico Sala	Italy	35	
322	Georges Gatier	France	DNF	
323	François Magatti	Switzerland	DNF	
324	Angelo Guidi	Italy	DNF	
325	Camille Leroy	Belgium	DNF	
