= List of cyclists in the 1921 Tour de France =

List of cyclists

In the 1921 Tour de France, two veteran cyclists who joined the race were Ernest Paul and Lucien Pothier, both forty years old. Paul rode his first Tour de France in 1908, while Pothier had started in the first Tour de France in 1903, and finished second. The winner of 1920, Philippe Thys, was the dominant stage racer of the time, but he was recovering from an illness and could not compete for the victory.

The economic impact of World War I was still not over, so as in the previous years there were not sponsored teams, but the cycling companies had bundled their forces under the nick La Sportive. The cyclists were divided in two categories, this time named 1ère class (first class), the professionals, and 2ème classe (second class), the amateurs. This year, some of the second class cyclists would finish higher than some of the first class cyclists.

The 1921 Tour de France saw the introduction of foreign press. They followed the race in their own cars. For the first time, an inhabitant from Monaco joined the Tour de France. Laurent Devalle needed more than twenty-seven hours for the fifth stage, and would finally give up in the eleventh stage.

== By starting number ==
Legend
No.	Starting number worn by the rider during the Tour
Pos.	Position in the general classification
DNF	Denotes a rider who did not finish

No.	Name	Nationality	Pos.	Ref
1	Eugène Christophe	France	DNF	
2	Jean Rossius	Belgium	DNF	
3	Hector Heusghem	Belgium	2	
4	Firmin Lambot	Belgium	9	
5	Honoré Barthélémy	France	3	
6	Jean Alavoine	France	DNF	
7	Louis Mottiat	Belgium	11	
8	Louis Heusghem	Belgium	DNF	
9	René Vermandel	Belgium	DNF	
10	Félix Goethals	France	10	
11	Émile Masson	Belgium	DNF	
12	Hector Tiberghien	Belgium	5	
13	Romain Bellenger	France	DNF	
15	Philippe Thys	Belgium	DNF	
16	Charles Juseret	Belgium	DNF	
17	Robert Jacquinot	France	DNF	
18	Albert Dejonghe	Belgium	DNF	
19	Léon Scieur	Belgium	1	
20	Jacques Coomans	Belgium	DNF	
21	René Chassot	France	DNF	
22	Alfred Steux	Belgium	DNF	
23	Marcel Godard	France	DNF	
24	Robert Gerbaud	France	DNF	
25	Luigi Lucotti	Italy	4	
101	Joseph Rayen	France	DNF	
102	André Coutte	France	DNF	
103	Paul Coppens	France	30	
104	Henri Catelan	France	38	
105	Eugène Dhers	France	12	
106	Jules Lebreton	France	DNF	
107	Robert Martens	France	DNF	
108	Alexandre Bodinier	France	DNF	
109	Robert Constantin	France	34	
110	Félix Sellier	Belgium	16	
111	Edgard Roy	France	28	
112	Ange-Marie Aubry	France	DNF	
113	Raoul Petouille	France	DNF	
114	Émile Dalifard	France	DNF	
115	Charles Cento	France	35	
116	Antoine Rière	France	DNF	
117	Pierre Hudsyn	Belgium	22	
118	Camille Botté	Belgium	DNF	
119	Édouard Léonard	France	DNF	
120	Gaston Degy	France	DNF	
121	Alexandre Gilles	France	DNF	
122	Maurice Pesnin	France	DNF	
123	Jules Deloffre	France	26	
124	Lucien Pothier	France	32	
126	Léon Despontin	Belgium	7	
127	François Chevalier	France	DNF	
128	Jean Kienlen	France	31	
129	Fernand Moulet	France	DNF	
131	Maurice Armand	France	DNF	
132	Charles Pavese	France	DNF	
133	Guillaume Cecherelli	France	19	
134	Émile Dorvilliers	France	DNF	
135	François Colomines	France	DNF	
136	Jules Beyens	Belgium	DNF	
137	Robert Asse	France	DNF	
138	Étienne Dorfeuille	France	24	
139	Victor Lenaers	Belgium	6	
140	Henri Ferrara	France	13	
141	Noël Amenc	France	14	
142	Napoléon Paoli	France	DNF	
143	Théodore Abada	France	DNF	
144	Adrien Alpini	France	37	
146	Lucien Roquebert	France	33	
147	Gwénolé Michel	France	DNF	
148	Clotaire Guillon	France	DNF	
149	Charles Hennuyer	France	DNF	
150	René Paxion	France	DNF	
151	Henri Miège	Switzerland	DNF	
152	José Pelletier	France	DNF	
153	Paul Seigne	France	DNF	
154	Georges Kamm	France	36	
155	Pierre Excoffier	France	DNF	
156	Laurent Devalle	Monaco	DNF	
157	Emile Brelloch	France	DNF	
158	Firmin Pauloin	France	DNF	
159	Ernest Paul	France	27	
160	Jules Banino	France	DNF	
161	Daniel Dagrau	France	DNF	
162	Joseph Normand	France	23	
163	Lucien Lagouche	France	DNF	
164	René Billing	France	DNF	
169	Arthur Claerhout	Belgium	DNF	
171	Jules Nempon	France	DNF	
172	Jean Belvaux	Belgium	DNF	
173	Auguste Meyer	France	20	
174	Benjamin Javaux	Belgium	21	
175	Louis Budts	Belgium	DNF	
178	Pierre Coolens	Belgium	DNF	
179	Jules Bertrand	France	DNF	
180	Nicolas Urme	France	DNF	
181	Camille Leroy	Belgium	8	
183	Charles Raboisson	France	25	
184	Angelo Erba	Italy	DNF	
186	Enrico Sala	Italy	18	
187	Michele Brega	Italy	DNF	
190	Mario Verzeletti	Italy	DNF	
191	Lucien Abbe	France	DNF	
192	Julien Samyn	France	DNF	
194	Charles Hans	France	DNF	
198	Léon Bonnery	France	DNF	
199	Edouard Tibal	France	DNF	
200	Charles Parel	Switzerland	29	
201	Louis Lembeye	France	DNF	
203	Silvio Borsetti	Italy	DNF	
204	Camille Dulac	France	DNF	
205	Alexis Rosset	France	DNF	
206	Eugène Poncelin	France	DNF	
207	Charles Loew	France	DNF	
210	Joseph Muller	France	15	
211	Armand Thewis	Belgium	DNF	
213	Jean Riou	France	DNF	
214	Louis Verbraecken	Belgium	DNF	
216	Emile Ledran	France	DNF	
217	Émile Lejeune	France	DNF	
218	Henri Collé	Switzerland	17	
220	Jacques Van Rompaey	Belgium	DNF	
221	Mathieu Caplat	France	DNF	
222	Pietro Casati	Italy	DNF	
224	Jaime Janer	Spain	DNF	
