= 1923 Tour de France, Stage 1 to Stage 8 =

Cycling race stages

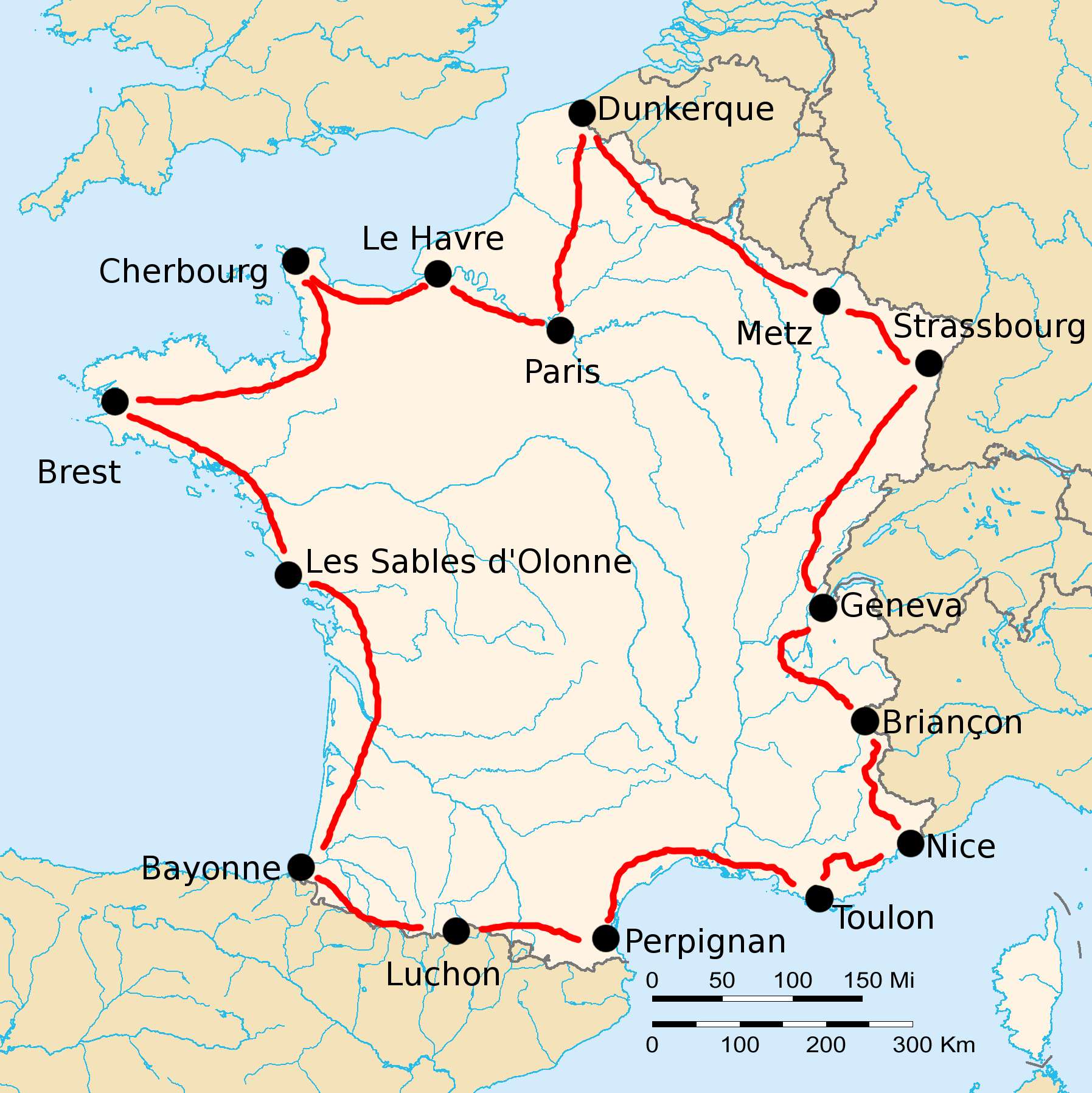
Route of the 1923 Tour de France

The 1923 Tour de France was the 17th edition of Tour de France, one of cycling's Grand Tours. The Tour began in Paris with a flat stage on 24 June, and Stage 8 occurred on 8 July with a flat stage to Toulon. The race finished in Paris on 22 July.

== Stage 1 ==
24 June 1923 — Paris to Le Havre, 381 km (237 mi)

Stage 1 result and general classification after stage 1

Rank	Rider	Time
1	Robert Jacquinot (FRA)	13h 51' 56"
2	Ottavio Bottecchia (ITA)	+ 1' 55"
3	Romain Bellenger (FRA)	s.t.
4	Hector Tiberghien (BEL)	s.t.
5	Léon Scieur (BEL)	s.t.
6	Joseph Van Daele (BEL)	+ 2' 17"
7	Félix Goethals (FRA)	+ 3' 57"
8	Marcel Godard (FRA)	s.t.
9	Honoré Barthélémy (FRA)	+ 7' 25"
10	Gaston Degy (FRA)	+ 8' 01"

== Stage 2 ==
26 June 1923 — Le Havre to Cherbourg-en-Cotentin, 371 km (231 mi)

Stage 2 result

Rank	Rider	Time
1	Ottavio Bottecchia (ITA)	14h 11' 41"
2	Louis Mottiat (BEL)	s.t.
3	Romain Bellenger (FRA)	s.t.
4	Joseph Normand (FRA)	+ 2"
5	Léon Despontin (BEL)	s.t.
6	Lucien Rich (FRA)	s.t.
7	Camille Botte (BEL)	+ 47"
8	Firmin Lambot (BEL)	+ 1' 09"
9	Léon Scieur (FRA)	s.t.
10	Henri Pélissier (FRA)	+ 1' 46"

General classification after stage 2

Rank	Rider	Time
1	Ottavio Bottecchia (ITA)	
2	Romain Bellenger (FRA)	+ 2' 00"
3	Léon Scieur (FRA)	+ 3' 09"
4		
5		
6		
7		
8		
9		
10		

== Stage 3 ==
28 June 1923 — Cherbourg-en-Cotentin to Brest, 405 km (252 mi)

Stage 3 result

Rank	Rider	Time
1	Henri Pélissier (FRA)	15h 44' 15"
2	Francis Pélissier (FRA)	s.t.
3	Ottavio Bottecchia (ITA)	+ 37"
4	Philippe Thys (BEL)	s.t.
5	Romain Bellenger (FRA)	s.t.
6	Hector Tiberghien (BEL)	s.t.
7	Lucien Buysse (BEL)	s.t.
8	Félix Goethals (FRA)	+ 4' 14"
9	Léon Scieur (FRA)	s.t.
10	Alfons Standaert (BEL)	+ 4' 42"

General classification after stage 3

Rank	Rider	Time
1	Ottavio Bottecchia (ITA)	
2	Romain Bellenger (FRA)	+ 2' 00"
3	Léon Scieur (FRA)	+ 6' 41"
4		
5		
6		
7		
8		
9		
10		

== Stage 4 ==
30 June 1923 — Brest to Les Sables-d'Olonne, 412 km (256 mi)

Stage 4 result

Rank	Rider	Time
1	Albert Dejonghe (BEL)	15h 13' 30"
2	Hector Tiberghien (BEL)	s.t.
3	Philippe Thys (BEL)	s.t.
4	Eugène Dhers (FRA)	+ 8' 13"
5	Romain Bellenger (FRA)	+ 9' 20"
6	Jean Alavoine (FRA)	s.t.
7	Firmin Lambot (BEL)	s.t.
8	Félix Goethals (FRA)	+ 11' 06"
9	Ottavio Bottecchia (ITA)	+ 15' 14"
10	Francis Pélissier (FRA)	s.t.

General classification after stage 4

Rank	Rider	Time
1	Romain Bellenger (FRA)	
2	Hector Tiberghien (BEL)	+ 3' 15"
3	Ottavio Bottecchia (ITA)	+ 3' 54"
4		
5		
6		
7		
8		
9		
10		

== Stage 5 ==
2 July 1923 — Les Sables-d'Olonne to Bayonne, 482 km (300 mi)

Stage 5 result

Rank	Rider	Time
1	Robert Jacquinot (FRA)	20h 16' 26"
2	Louis Mottiat (BEL)	s.t.
3	Joseph Normand (FRA)	s.t.
4	Ottavio Bottecchia (ITA)	s.t.
5	Alfons Standaert (BEL)	s.t.
6	Henri Pélissier (FRA)	s.t.
7	Léon Van Aken (BEL)	s.t.
8	Arsène Alancourt (FRA)	s.t.
9	Félix Goethals (FRA)	s.t.
10	Eugène Dhers (FRA)	s.t.

General classification after stage 5

Rank	Rider	Time
1	Romain Bellenger (FRA)	
2	Hector Tiberghien (BEL)	+ 3' 15"
3	Ottavio Bottecchia (ITA)	+ 3' 54"
4		
5		
6		
7		
8		
9		
10		

== Stage 6 ==
4 July 1923 — Bayonne to Luchon, 326 km (203 mi)

Stage 6 result

Rank	Rider	Time
1	Jean Alavoine (FRA)	16h 05' 22"
2	Robert Jacquinot (FRA)	+ 16' 05"
3	Joseph Normand (FRA)	+ 16' 46"
4	Henri Pélissier (FRA)	+ 23' 18"
5	Camille Botte (BEL)	+ 24' 31"
6	Ottavio Bottecchia (ITA)	+ 27' 15"
7	Lucien Buysse (BEL)	+ 36' 38"
8	Arsène Alancourt (FRA)	+ 40' 38"
9	Henri Collé (SUI)	+ 41' 38"
10	Paul Duboc (FRA)	+ 51' 36"

General classification after stage 6

Rank	Rider	Time
1	Ottavio Bottecchia (ITA)	
2	Jean Alavoine (FRA)	+ 8' 28"
3	Romain Bellenger (FRA)	+ 21' 50"
4		
5		
6		
7		
8		
9		
10		

== Stage 7 ==
6 July 1923 — Luchon to Perpignan, 323 km (201 mi)

Stage 7 result

Rank	Rider	Time
1	Jean Alavoine (FRA)	12h 47' 58"
2	Romain Bellenger (FRA)	s.t.
3	Henri Pélissier (FRA)	s.t.
4	Francis Pélissier (FRA)	s.t.
5	Hector Tiberghien (BEL)	s.t.
6	Ottavio Bottecchia (ITA)	s.t.
7	Henri Collé (SUI)	s.t.
8	Théophile Beeckman (BEL)	+ 2' 30"
9	Léon Despontin (BEL)	s.t.
10	Arsène Alancourt (FRA)	s.t.

General classification after stage 7

Rank	Rider	Time
1	Ottavio Bottecchia (ITA)	
2	Jean Alavoine (FRA)	+ 8' 28"
3	Romain Bellenger (FRA)	+ 21' 50"
4		
5		
6		
7		
8		
9		
10		

== Stage 8 ==
8 July 1923 — Perpignan to Toulon, 427 km (265 mi)

Stage 8 result

Rank	Rider	Time
1	Lucien Buysse (BEL)	16h 15' 35"
2	Ottavio Bottecchia (ITA)	+ 16' 16"
3	Henri Pélissier (FRA)	s.t.
4	Hector Tiberghien (BEL)	s.t.
5	Marcel Huot (FRA)	s.t.
6	Robert Jacquinot (FRA)	s.t.
7	Francis Pélissier (FRA)	s.t.
8	Joseph Muller (FRA)	s.t.
9	Lucien Rich (FRA)	s.t.
10	Joseph Normand (FRA)	s.t.

General classification after stage 8

Rank	Rider	Time
1	Ottavio Bottecchia (ITA)	
2	Jean Alavoine (FRA)	+ 14' 19"
3	Henri Pélissier (FRA)	+ 22' 08"
4		
5		
6		
7		
8		
9		
10		
