= 1923 Tour de France, Stage 9 to Stage 15 =

Cycling race stages

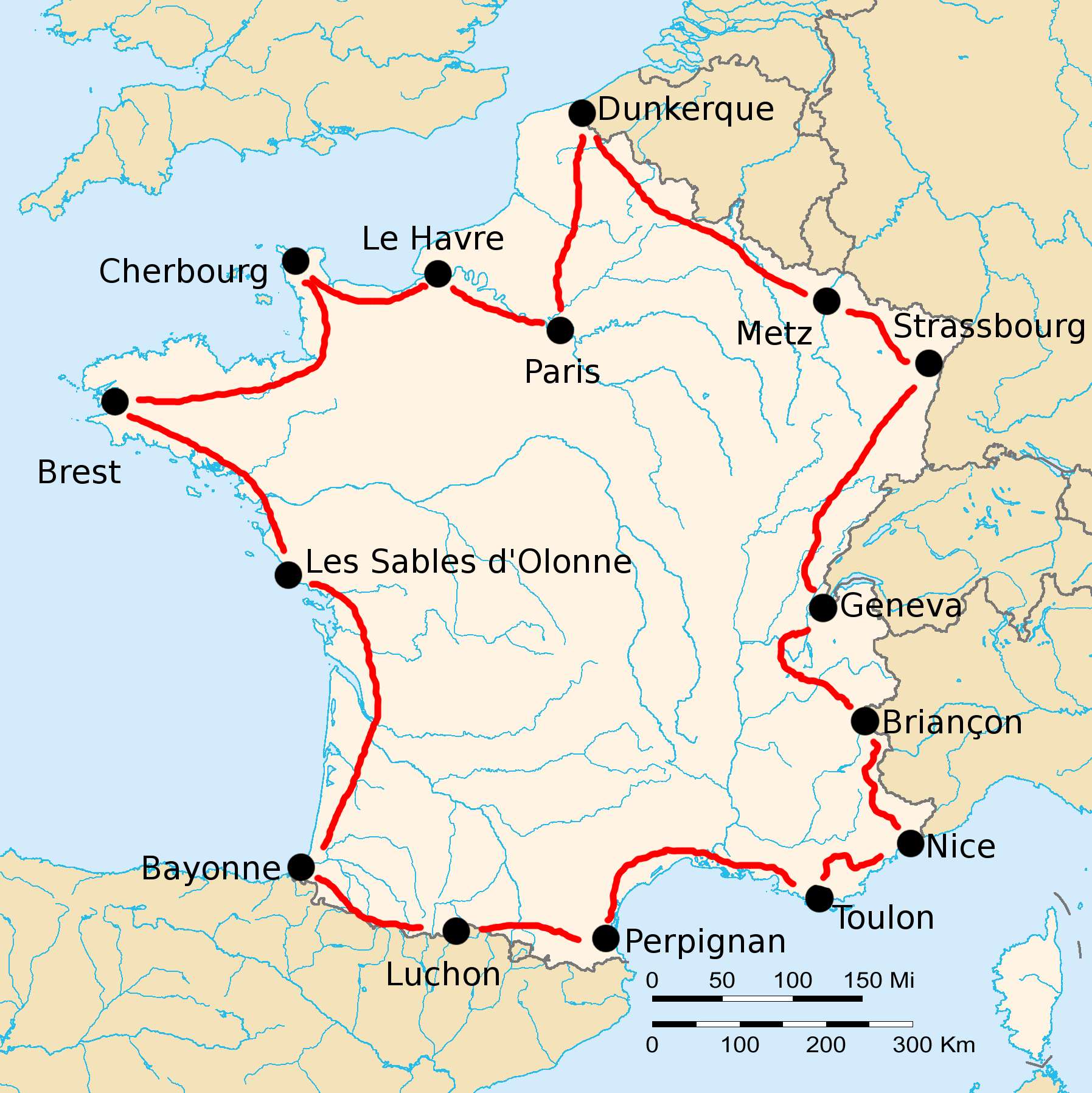
Route of the 1923 Tour de France

The 1923 Tour de France was the 17th edition of Tour de France, one of cycling's Grand Tours. The Tour began in Paris with a flat stage on 24 June, and Stage 9 occurred on 10 July with a mountainous stage from Toulon. The race finished in Paris on 22 July.

== Stage 9 ==
10 July 1923 — Toulon to Nice, 281 km (175 mi)

Stage 9 result

Rank	Rider	Time
1	Jean Alavoine (FRA)	12h 10' 39"
2	Ottavio Bottecchia (ITA)	s.t.
3	Henri Collé (SUI)	s.t.
4	Romain Bellenger (FRA)	+ 2' 14"
5	Louis Mottiat (BEL)	+ 4' 51"
6	Lucien Buysse (BEL)	s.t.
7	Joseph Muller (FRA)	s.t.
8	Henri Pélissier (FRA)	+ 7' 44"
9	Léon Despontin (BEL)	+ 8' 40"
10	Marcel Huot (FRA)	+ 11' 20"

General classification after stage 9

Rank	Rider	Time
1	Ottavio Bottecchia (ITA)	
2	Jean Alavoine (FRA)	+ 12' 19"
3	Henri Pélissier (FRA)	+ 29' 52"
4		
5		
6		
7		
8		
9		
10		

== Stage 10 ==
12 July 1923 — Nice to Briançon, 275 km (171 mi)

Stage 10 result

Rank	Rider	Time
1	Henri Pélissier (FRA)	12h 45' 29"
2	Lucien Buysse (BEL)	+ 5' 28"
3	Arsène Alancourt (FRA)	+ 18' 24"
4	Hector Tiberghien (BEL)	s.t.
5	Jean Alavoine (FRA)	+ 26' 58"
6	Henri Collé (SUI)	+ 32' 26"
7	Léon Despontin (BEL)	+ 33' 40"
8	Romain Bellenger (FRA)	+ 38' 35"
9	Théophile Beeckman (BEL)	s.t.
10	Eugène Dhers (FRA)	+ 39' 29"

General classification after stage 10

Rank	Rider	Time
1	Henri Pélissier (FRA)	
2	Jean Alavoine (FRA)	+ 11' 25"
3	Ottavio Bottecchia (ITA)	+ 13' 16"
4		
5		
6		
7		
8		
9		
10		

== Stage 11 ==
14 July 1923 — Briançon to Geneva, 260 km (160 mi)

Stage 11 result

Rank	Rider	Time
1	Henri Pélissier (FRA)	9h 50' 21"
2	Francis Pélissier (FRA)	s.t.
3	Romain Bellenger (FRA)	+ 8' 33"
4	Félix Goethals (FRA)	+ 13' 56"
5	Ottavio Bottecchia (ITA)	s.t.
6	Arsène Alancourt (FRA)	s.t.
7	Lucien Buysse (BEL)	s.t.
8	Théophile Beeckman (BEL)	+ 17' 35"
9	Joseph Muller (FRA)	s.t.
10	Georges Cuvelier (FRA)	s.t.

General classification after stage 11

Rank	Rider	Time
1	Henri Pélissier (FRA)	
2	Ottavio Bottecchia (ITA)	+ 29' 12"
3	Romain Bellenger (FRA)	+ 1h 05' 14"
4		
5		
6		
7		
8		
9		
10		

== Stage 12 ==
16 July 1923 — Geneva to Strasbourg, 377 km (234 mi)

Stage 12 result

Rank	Rider	Time
1	Joseph Muller (FRA)	15h 08' 51"
2	Lucien Buysse (BEL)	+ 24' 34"
3	Marcel Huot (FRA)	s.t.
4	Benjamin Mortier (BEL)	+ 34' 35"
5	Louis Mottiat (BEL)	s.t.
6	Alfons Standaert (BEL)	s.t.
7	Lucien Rich (FRA)	s.t.
8	Eugène Dhers (FRA)	s.t.
9	Gaston Degy (FRA)	s.t.
10	Théophile Beeckman (BEL)	s.t.

General classification after stage 12

Rank	Rider	Time
1	Henri Pélissier (FRA)	
2	Ottavio Bottecchia (ITA)	+ 29' 12"
3	Romain Bellenger (FRA)	+ 1h 05' 14"
4		
5		
6		
7		
8		
9		
10		

== Stage 13 ==
18 July 1923 — Strasbourg to Metz, 300 km (190 mi)

Stage 13 result

Rank	Rider	Time
1	Romain Bellenger (FRA)	11h 36' 00"
2	Félix Goethals (FRA)	s.t.
3	Alfons Standaert (BEL)	s.t.
4	Henri Pélissier (FRA)	s.t.
5	Ottavio Bottecchia (ITA)	s.t.
6	Eugène Dhers (FRA)	s.t.
7	Georges Cuvelier (FRA)	s.t.
8	Joseph Muller (FRA)	s.t.
9	Louis Mottiat (BEL)	s.t.
10	Henri Collé (SUI)	s.t.

General classification after stage 13

Rank	Rider	Time
1	Henri Pélissier (FRA)	
2	Ottavio Bottecchia (ITA)	+ 29' 12"
3	Romain Bellenger (FRA)	+ 1h 03' 18"
4		
5		
6		
7		
8		
9		
10		

== Stage 14 ==
20 July 1923 — Metz to Dunkerque, 433 km (269 mi)

Stage 14 result

Rank	Rider	Time
1	Félix Goethals (FRA)	18h 55' 08"
2	Hector Tiberghien (BEL)	s.t.
3	Théophile Beeckman (BEL)	s.t.
4	Arsène Alancourt (FRA)	+ 1' 18"
5	Henri Pélissier (FRA)	+ 2' 59"
6	Ottavio Pratesi (ITA)	s.t.
7	Ottavio Bottecchia (ITA)	+ 4' 28"
8	Romain Bellenger (FRA)	s.t.
9	Léon Despontin (BEL)	+ 6' 26"
10	Georges Cuvelier (FRA)	+ 8' 06"

General classification after stage 14

Rank	Rider	Time
1	Henri Pélissier (FRA)	
2	Ottavio Bottecchia (ITA)	+ 30' 41"
3	Romain Bellenger (FRA)	+ 1h 04' 43"
4		
5		
6		
7		
8		
9		
10		

== Stage 15 ==
22 July 1923 — Dunkerque to Paris, 343 km (213 mi)

Stage 15 result

Rank	Rider	Time
1	Félix Goethals (FRA)	15h 19' 36"
2	Henri Pélissier (FRA)	s.t.
3	Louis Mottiat (BEL)	s.t.
4	Robert Jacquinot (FRA)	s.t.
5	Arsène Alancourt (FRA)	s.t.
6	Francis Pélissier (FRA)	s.t.
7	Marcel Huot (FRA)	s.t.
8	Georges Cuvelier (FRA)	s.t.
9	Lucien Buysse (BEL)	s.t.
10	Théophile Beeckman (BEL)	s.t.

General classification after stage 15

Rank	Rider	Time
1	Henri Pélissier (FRA)	222h 15' 30"
2	Ottavio Bottecchia (ITA)	+ 30' 41"
3	Romain Bellenger (FRA)	+ 1h 04' 43"
4	Hector Tiberghien (BEL)	+ 1h 29' 16"
5	Arsène Alancourt (FRA)	+ 2h 06' 40"
6	Henri Collé (SUI)	+ 2h 28' 43"
7	Léon Despontin (BEL)	+ 2h 39' 49"
8	Lucien Buysse (BEL)	+ 2h 40' 11"
9	Eugène Dhers (FRA)	+ 2h 59' 09"
10	Marcel Huot (FRA)	+ 3h 16' 56"
