= Trophée des Grimpeurs =

Cycling road race in Val-d'Oise, France

Race details
- Date: April–May
- Region: Val-d'Oise, France
- English name: Trophy of the Climbers
- Local name: Trophée des Grimpeurs (in French)
- Discipline: Road race
- Competition: UCI Europe Tour; French road cycling cup
- Type: Single-day
- Organiser: Routes et Cycles Organisation
- Race director: Hervé Gérardin

History
- First edition: 1913
- Editions: 83
- Final edition: 2009
- First winner: Georges Fusier (FRA)
- Most wins: 3 wins Didier Rous (FRA); Pierre Bachellerie (FRA)
- Final winner: Thomas Voeckler (FRA)

The Trophée des Grimpeurs, called Polymultipliée until 1970, was a single-day road bicycle race held annually in August in the region of Val-d'Oise, France, between Argenteuil and Sannois. Between 1980 and 2002 it was a criterium. Since 2005, the race was organized as a 1.1 event on the UCI Europe Tour, also being part of the Coupe de France de cyclisme sur route. In 2009 the race was last held, due to financial difficulties.

Since 2000, there has been a women's event. In 2009 it was won by Jeannie Longo.

== Winners, Men's ==
Year	Country	Rider	Team
1913	France	Georges Fusier	individual
1914	France	Eugène Christophe	Peugeot–Wolber
1915– 1920	No race		
1921	France	Georges Habert	individual
1922	France	Fernand Canteloube	Thomann–Dunlop
1923	France	Charles Lacquehay	JB Louvet–Soly–Dunlop
1924	France	Pierre Bachellerie	Alcyon–Dunlop
1925	France	Georges Davoine	individual
1926	France	Pierre Bachellerie	Alcyon–Dunlop
1927	France	Pierre Bachellerie	Alcyon–Dunlop
1928	France	Joseph Normand	individual
1929	France	Joseph Normand	individual
1930	France	Eugène Fauré	individual
1931	France	Marcel Mazeyrat	Chemineau–Wolber
1932	France	Léon Fichot	individual
1933	France	Jean Montpied	individual
1934	France	Marcel Mazeyrat	individual
1935	France	Léon Level	Helyett–Hutchinson
1936	France	André Auville	Labor–Dunlop
1937	France	Louis Thiétard	Génial Lucifer–Hutchinson
1938	France	René Vietto	Helyett–Hutchinson
1939	France	Lucien Le Guével	Peugeot–Dunlop
1940	No race		
1941	France	Jean-Marie Goasmat	Helyett–Hutchinson
1942	France	Jean-Marie Goasmat	Mercier–Hutchinson
1943	France	Amédée Rolland	Mercier–Hutchinson
1944	France	Gaston Grimbert	Erka–Dunlop
1945	No race		
1946	France	Pierre Baratin	Follis–Dunlop
1947	France	Jean Blanc	Metropole–Dunlop
1948	France	Pierre Baratin	Rhonson–Dunlop
1949	France	Apo Lazaridès	France Sport–Dunlop
1950	France	Raphaël Géminiani	Metropole–Dunlop
1951	France	Raphaël Géminiani	Metropole–Dunlop
1952	France	Jean Robic	Colomb–Dunlop
1953	France	Antonin Canavèse	Vietto-Alessandro
1954	Belgium	Richard Van Genechten	Bertin–d'Alessandro
1955	France	Valentin Huot	Rochet–Dunlop
1956	Belgium	Richard Van Genechten	Elvé–Peugeot
1957	France	Louis Bergaud	Saint-Raphaël–R. Geminiani
1958	France	Louis Bergaud	Saint-Raphaël–R. Geminiani
1959	France	René Pavard	Helyett–Fynsec
1960	Belgium	René Vanderveken	Peugeot–Dunlop
1961	France	Édouard Bihouée	Mercier–BP–Hutchinson
1962	France	Louis Rostollan	Saint-Raphaël–Helyett
1963	No race		
1964	France	André Le Dissez	Mercier–BP–Hutchinson
1965	No race		
1966	No race		
1967	Spain	Julio Jiménez	Bic
1968	France	Jean Jourden	Frimatic–Viva–De Gribaldy
1969	France	Raymond Delisle	Peugeot–BP–Michelin
1970	France	Lucien Aimar	Sonolor–Lejeune
1971	No race		
1972	Netherlands	Joop Zoetemelk	Flandria–Beaulieu
1973	Spain	Luis Ocaña	Bic
1974	No race		
1975	France	Antoine Gutierrez	Alsaver–Jeunet–De Gribaldy
1976	Belgium	Lucien Van Impe	Gitane–Campagnolo
1977	France	Raymond Delisle	Miko–Mercier
1978	No race		
1979	Netherlands	Joop Zoetemelk	Miko–Mercier–Vivagel
1980	France	Raymond Martin	Miko–Mercier–Vivagel
1981	France	Dominique Celle	
1982	France	Pierre-Raymond Villemiane	Wolber
1983	Denmark	Kim Andersen	Coop–Mercier
1984	France	Marc Madiot	Renault–Elf
1985	France	Martial Gayant	Renault–Elf
1986	France	Éric Caritoux	Fagor
1987	France	Charles Bérard	Toshiba–Look
1988	Belgium	Stéphane Morjean	Hitachi–Bosal
1989	France	Henri Abadie	Z–Peugeot
1990	Belgium	Luc Roosen	Histor–Sigma
1991	Norway	Atle Kvålsvoll	Z
1992	France	Marc Madiot	Telekom
1993	France	Thierry Claveyrolat	Gan
1994	France	Richard Virenque	Festina–Lotus
1995	France	Armand de Las Cuevas	Castorama
1996	France	Stéphane Heulot	Gan
1997	Italy	Davide Rebellin	Française des Jeux
1998	France	Pascal Hervé	Festina–Lotus
1999	France	Laurent Roux	Casino
2000	France	Patrice Halgand	Jean Delatour
2001	France	Didier Rous	Bonjour
2002	France	Sylvain Chavanel	Bonjour
2003	France	Didier Rous	Brioches La Boulangère
2004	France	Christophe Moreau	Crédit Agricole
2005	Belgium	Philippe Gilbert	La Française des Jeux
2006	France	Didier Rous	Bouygues Telecom
2007	France	Anthony Geslin	Bouygues Telecom
2008	France	David Lelay	Bretagne–Armor Lux
2009	France	Thomas Voeckler	Bbox Bouygues Telecom

== Winners, Women's ==
Year	Country	Rider	Team
2009	France	Jeannie Longo	
