= Émile Lejeune =

Émile Lejeune is the name of:

- Emile Lejeune (1885–?), US sailor, recipient of the Medal of Honor
- Émile Lejeune (cyclist) (1895–1973), French cyclist
- Émile Lejeune (painter) (1885–1964), Swiss painter born in Geneva, see Les Six
- Émile Lejeune (footballer) (1938–2024), Belgian footballer

== See also ==
- Lejeune
