= Caroline Lejeune =

Caroline Lejeune may refer to:

- C. A. Lejeune (Caroline A. Lejeune, 1897–1973), English journalist and film critic
- Caroline Lejeune (skater) (born 1986), French free-style skater

== See also ==
- Lejeune
