= Towers of Milan =

Towers in Milan, Italy, with historical military and civilian roles

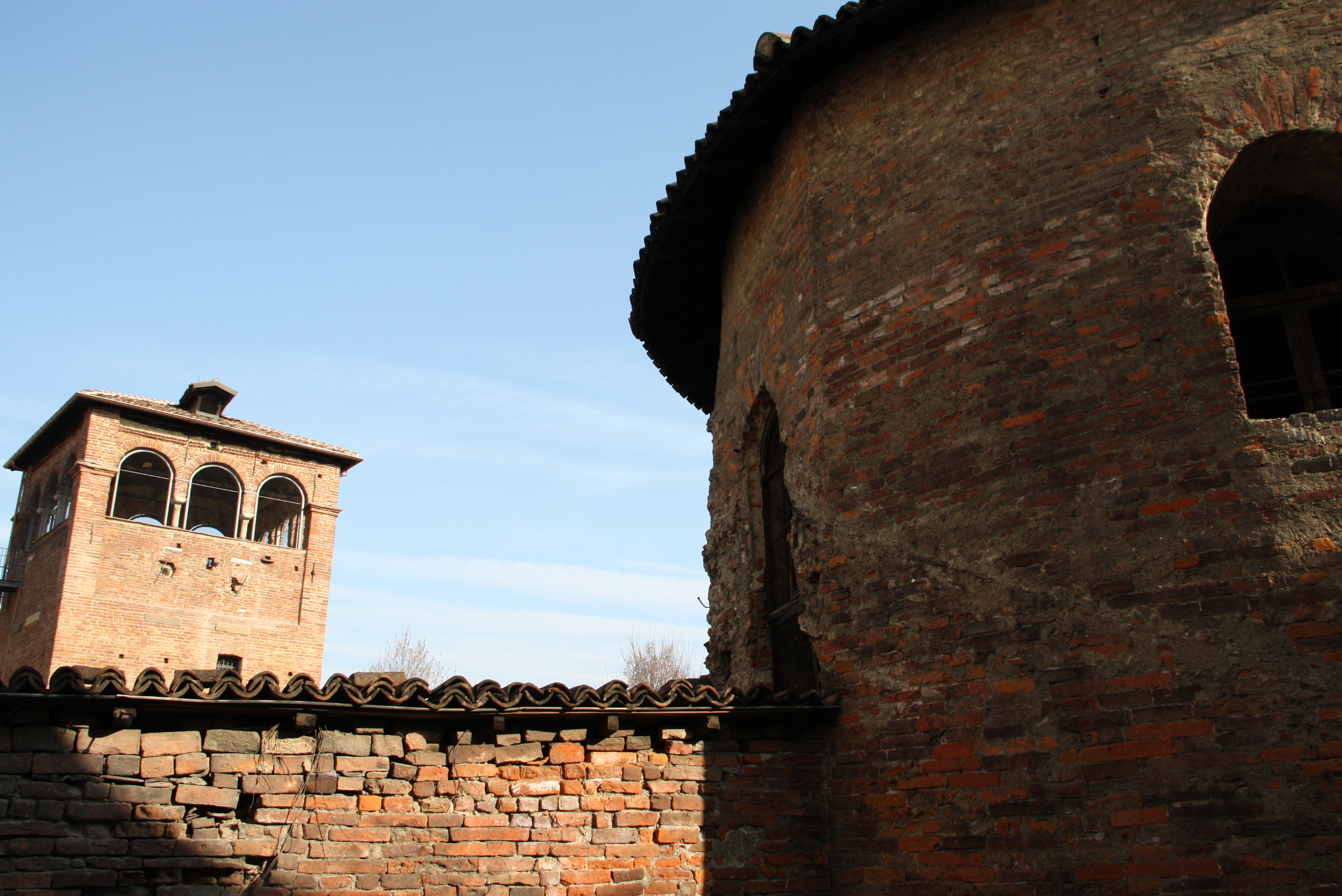
In the foreground on the right, the tower that was once part of the Maximian expansion of the Roman walls of Milan, while in the background on the left, the tower of the carceres, i.e., the gates from which the chariots of the Roman circus of Milan started. Both are located in the courtyard of the Archaeological Museum of Milan

The towers of Milan have played significant military and civilian roles throughout the history of the city. Built starting from the Roman era, they were for centuries one of the characteristic features of Milan, especially in the Middle Ages, when they served as reference points for the Milan contrade. In modern times, the construction of buildings in the form of towers, with a predominant vertical development, has continued with the erection of the skyscrapers of Milan.

== History ==
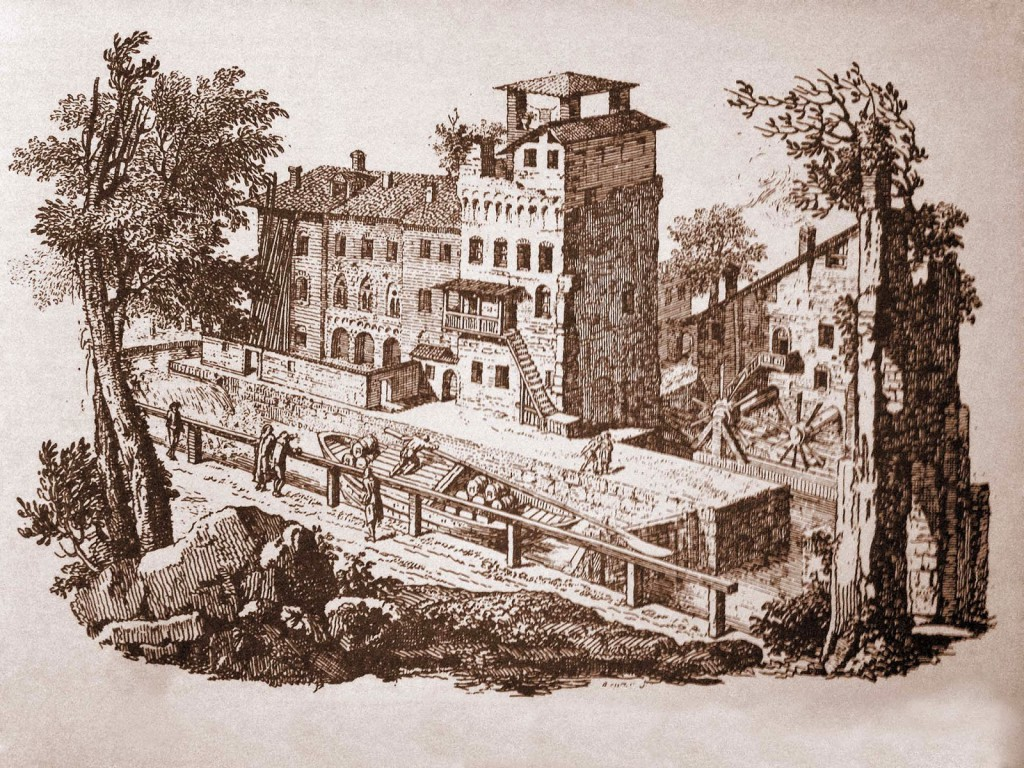
Engraving from 1792 depicting the Pusterla della Chiusa and the building connected to it. They were located along the Cerchia dei Navigli

The history of the towers of Milan begins in the Roman era, with the construction of towers serving military purposes, such as those incorporated into the Roman walls of Milan, and civilian functions, such as the tower of the carceres, i.e., the gates from which the chariots of the Roman circus of Milan started.

A turning point, particularly in their military function, occurred starting in the Middle Ages. Each contrada of Milan, a historical subdivision of the city’s inhabited center used from the Middle Ages to the 19th century, had a watchtower as a reference point, often integrated into a noble palace, which was garrisoned by a cavalry unit (the so-called milites), composed of nobles. The towers along the medieval walls of Milan were instead garrisoned by most of the city’s troops

Noteworthy are the towers of the Sforza Castle, which was built as an expansion of a pre-existing fortification, the Castello di Porta Giovia, constructed between 1360 and 1370 in the form of a quadrangular military fortification with four towers at the corners, with the two facing the city being particularly imposing. It was Francesco Sforza who transformed, through works that began in 1450, the Castello di Porta Giovia into the Castello Sforzesco, from which the fortification takes its name.

In 1452, the Filarete was commissioned by the duke for the construction and decoration of the central tower of the Castello Sforzesco, still called the Torre del Filarete. In 1476, under the regency of Bona of Savoy, the tower named after her was built, along with the Torre del Tesoro, also known as the Torre della Castellana, located at the western corner of the castle. On June 28, 1521, the Torre del Filarete exploded due to a French soldier who accidentally detonated a bomb after the tower had been converted into an armory. The Torre del Filarete was rebuilt during the restoration of the Castello Sforzesco, completed in 1905, using 16th-century drawings that allowed for the reconstruction of its original appearance.

Other towers in Milan were built as part of the Spanish walls of Milan, where they played a significant defensive and military role. Towers continued to be constructed in the following centuries, up to modern times, when the city’s skyscrapers were added, built starting from the early decades of the 20th century.

== List of towers ==
The most significant towers of Milan, both existing and demolished, are the following.

=== Roman era ===
Name	Image	Construction	Demolition	Description
Roman Tower of Porta Ticinese		1st century BC	existing	Also known as "Torre dei Malsani" or "Torraccia," it is what remains of Roman Porta Ticinese. It is located in the courtyard of one of the buildings near the Carrobbio. It consists of the remains of one of the two towers that flanked the entrance gate. It is known as "Torre dei Malsani" because, after losing its defensive function, it was used as a leper hospital.
Tower of the Maximian Roman Walls		3rd century AD	existing	Tower that was once part of the Maximian expansion of the Roman walls of Milan. It is located in the courtyard of the Archaeological Museum of Milan.
Tower of the carceres of the Circus		3rd century AD	existing	Tower of the carceres, i.e., the gates from which the chariots of the Roman circus of Milan started. The remains of this tower later became the bell tower of the Church of San Maurizio. It is now located in the courtyard of the Archaeological Museum of Milan.

=== Medieval era ===
Name	Image	Construction	Demolition	Description
Torre del Comune		1272	existing	Originally from the 13th century but rebuilt in the 17th century, it marked the official opening and closing hours of activities. It is located above the Palazzo dei Giureconsulti, opposite Piazza Mercanti. At its base is the neoclassical statue of Saint Ambrose, sculpted by Luigi Scorzini in 1833, surrounded by Mannerist reliefs. Below the clock, there is a Latin plaque by Prefect Fabrizio Bossi. It is also known as the Torre di Napo Torriani.
Torre dei Morigi		13th century	existing	Part of Palazzo Moriggia, located at the corner of Via Morigi and Via Gorani, residence of the Moriggia Marquises. It was once a reference point for the cavalry unit that garrisoned the Contrada dei Morigi.
Torre dei Gorani		13th century	existing	Part of the demolished Casa Gorani, which was located between Via Brisa and Via Gorani. The palace was situated along the street of the same name and was completely destroyed by the bombings of World War II in 1943. The Baroque portal, some perimeter walls, and the tower survive from the palace.
Torre dei Meravigli		13th century	existing	Incorporated into the Casa dei Meravigli, located in Via Meravigli. The tower is recognizable by its exposed brickwork. Its foundations date back to the 3rd century: the tower was incorporated and used as a bell tower for the Church of San Nazaro in Pietrasanta until its demolition in the early 20th century.
Torre di Palazzo Marino		13th century	1892	Part of Palazzo Marino, located in Piazza della Scala. It disappeared with the renovation of the palace, completed in 1892.
Torre del Sale		13th century	1943	Incorporated into a building located along the Naviglio Vallone. It was destroyed following an air raid on Milan in 1943. It was named after the storage of salt within it, although some historians dispute this hypothesis.
Torre dell'Imperatore		14th century	1777	Incorporated into a building located at the corner of Via Molino delle Armi and Via della Chiusa along the Cerchia dei Navigli. It owes its name to the Byzantine emperor Manuel I, who funded the reconstruction of the city’s defensive structures destroyed by Frederick Barbarossa during the siege of Milan in 1162. Via della Chiusa takes its name from a lock that regulated the water flow of the Cerchia dei Navigli: the Torre dell'Imperatore was built to provide a guarded outpost to protect this water regulation center. Initially, only the small tower overlooking the Pusterla della Chiusa existed; later, upon completion of the lock, a second, more massive tower was added, which would later take the name Torre dell'Imperatore. After losing its defensive function at the end of the 15th century, the Torre dell'Imperatore was repurposed for other uses until it was almost entirely demolished in 1777. The remains of its base survived until the early 20th century, when they were completely demolished along with the adjacent building.
Torre del Rinza		before 1450	?	Probably part of the noble palace of the Casati family.
Torre del Filarete		1452	existing	The main tower of the Sforza Castle. In 1521, the Torre del Filarete collapsed because a French soldier accidentally detonated a bomb after the tower had been converted into an armory. The tower was rebuilt during the restoration of the Sforza Castle, completed in 1905. Using 16th-century drawings, its original appearance was reconstructed.
Torre di Bona di Savoia		1476	existing	The tower of the Sforza Castle built under the regency of Bona of Savoy, wife of Galeazzo Maria Sforza. After the latter’s assassination, Bona of Savoy had a tower built for herself, named after her, in the safest area of the castle. Located at the intersection of the northeast and southeast wings, it was later used as a prison. From it, the entire castle could be monitored.
Torre del Tesoro		15th century	existing	Also called Torre della Castellana, it is located at the western corner of the Sforza Castle. It was named Torre del Tesoro because, being one of the most impregnable parts of the fortification, the treasury of the Duchy of Milan was kept there

=== Modern era ===
Name	Image	Construction	Demolition	Description
Torre di Palazzo Stampa di Soncino		16th century	existing	Part of Palazzo Stampa di Soncino, located in Via Soncino.
Torre di Palazzo Clerici		18th century	existing	Part of Palazzo Clerici, located in Via Clerici.

=== Contemporary era ===
Name	Image	Construction	Demolition	Description
Torre Branca		1933	existing	A steel structure built in 1933 based on a design by architect Gio Ponti. It is located within Parco Sempione.

== Bibliography ==
- Colombo, Alessandro (1935). I trentasei stendardi di Milano comunale [The Thirty-Six Banners of Municipal Milan] (PDF) (in Italian). Milano: Famiglia Meneghina.
