= Lejeune =

Lejeune, LeJeune or Le Jeune is a French surname (which in English could mean "the young" or "the younger"), and may refer to:

- Adrien Lejeune (1847-1942), French revolutionary
- Claude Le Jeune (1528/1530–1600), French composer
- Caroline Lejeune (disambiguation), multiple people
- Édouard Le Jeune (1921–2017), French politician
- Émile Lejeune (disambiguation), multiple people
- Florian Lejeune (born 1991), French footballer
- Francis St David Benwell Lejeune (1899–1984) British Army officer
- Geoffroy Lejeune (born 1988), French journalist
- Iry LeJeune (1928–1955), American musician
- Jean Lejeune (1592–1672), French priest
- Jean-Denis Lejeune (born 1959), Belgian activist
- Jérôme Lejeune (1926–1994), French geneticist
- John A. Lejeune (1867–1942), commandant of the United States Marine Corps
- Kevin Lejeune (born 1985), French footballer
- Larry LeJeune (1885–1952), American baseball player
- Lisanne Lejeune (born 1963), Dutch hockey player
- Louis Lejeune (disambiguation), multiple people
- Michel Lejeune (disambiguation), multiple people
- Norman LeJeune (born 1980), American football player
- Olivier Le Jeune, Canadian slave
- Paul Le Jeune (1591–1664), French Jesuit missionary in Canada
- Paul Lejeune-Jung (1882–1944), German economist and politician
- Philippe Lejeune (born 1938), French academic
- A pen name associated with Voltaire

== See also ==
- Lejeune Hall
- Marine Corps Base Camp Lejeune
- Lejeune High School
- LeJeune Road
- USS Lejeune (AP-74)
