= Verbraecken =

Verbraecken is a surname. Notable people with the surname include:

- Caroline Verbraecken-De Loose (1924–2001), Belgian gymnast
- Louis Verbraecken, Belgian racing cyclist
