= Lorenzo Costa (disambiguation) =

Lorenzo Costa may refer to:

- Lorenzo Costa, Italian painter during the Renaissance
- Lorenzo Costa the Younger, Italian painter during the Renaissance, not related to Lorenzo Costa
- Lorenzo Costa (cyclist), Italian cyclist in the 1922 Tour de France
