= Verzeletti =

Verzeletti is a surname. Notable people with the surname include:

- Céline Verzeletti (born 1969), French trade unionist
- Mario Verzeletti, Italian racing cyclist
