= Pierre Faillu =

French cyclist

Personal information
- Born: 1 January 1897
- Died: 28 March 1974 (aged 77)

Cycling career
- Sport: Cycling
- Discipline: Road
- Role: Rider

Pierre Faillu (1 January 1897 – 28 March 1974) was a French racing cyclist. He rode in the 1923 Tour de France.
