= Jules Vertriest =

Belgian cyclist

Personal information
- Born: 1 January 1897

Cycling career
- Sport: Cycling
- Role: Rider

Jules Vertriest (born 1 January 1897, date of death unknown) was a Belgian racing cyclist. He rode in the 1923 Tour de France.
