= Georges Decultot =

French cyclist

Personal information
- Born: 3 March 1893 Graimbouville, France
- Died: 31 January 1976 (aged 82)

Cycling career
- Sport: Cycling
- Discipline: Road
- Role: Rider

Georges Decultot (3 March 1893 – 31 January 1976) was a French racing cyclist. He rode in the 1924 Tour de France.
