= Eugène Leveille =

French cyclist

Personal information
- Born: 26 January 1901

Cycling career
- Sport: Cycling
- Discipline: Road
- Role: Rider

Eugène Leveille (born 26 January 1901, date of death unknown) was a French racing cyclist. He rode in the 1923 Tour de France.
