= 1922 Paris–Tours =

Race details
- Dates: 30 April 1922
- Stages: 1
- Distance: 342 km (212.5 mi)
- Winning time: 11h 32' 00"

Results
| | Winner | Henri Pélissier (FRA) |
| | Second | Heiri Suter (SUI) |
| | Third | Robert Jacquinot (FRA) |

The 1922 Paris–Tours was the 17th edition of the Paris–Tours cycle race and was held on 30 April 1922. The race started in Paris and finished in Tours. The race was won by Henri Pélissier.

== General classification ==
Final general classification

| Rank | Rider | Time |
|---|---|---|
| 1 | Henri Pélissier (FRA) | 11h 32' 00" |
| 2 | Heiri Suter (SUI) | + 0" |
| 3 | Robert Jacquinot (FRA) | + 0" |
| 4 | Arsène Alancourt (FRA) | + 0" |
| 4 | Théophile Beeckman (BEL) | + 0" |
| 4 | Jean Brunier (FRA) | + 0" |
| 4 | Eugène Christophe (FRA) | + 0" |
| 4 | Georges Detreille (FRA) | + 0" |
| 4 | Robert Gerbaud (FRA) | + 0" |
| 4 | Marcel Huot (FRA) | + 0" |
