= Camille Nicou =

French cyclist

Personal information
- Born: 5 September 1894

Cycling career
- Sport: Cycling
- Discipline: Road
- Role: Rider

Camille Nicou (born 5 September 1894, date of death unknown) was a French racing cyclist. He rode in the 1923 Tour de France.
