= Oscar Barselotti =

Italian cyclist

Personal information
- Born: 1 November 1899

Cycling career
- Sport: Cycling
- Discipline: Road
- Role: Rider

Oscar Barselotti (born 1 November 1899, date of death unknown) was an Italian racing cyclist. He rode in the 1923 Tour de France.
