= Michel Lejeune =

Michel Lejeune may refer to:

- Michel Lejeune (linguist) (1907–2000), French specialist in Ancient Greek
- Michel Lejeune (politician) (1946–2021), member of the National Assembly of France

== See also ==
- Lejeune, a surname, with a list of people so named
