= Louis Lejeune =

Louis Lejeune may refer to:

- Louis-François Lejeune (1775–1848), (Baron Lejeune), French general, painter, and lithographer
- Alexandre Louis Simon Lejeune (1779–1858), Belgian botanist
- Louis Lejeune Ltd., British maker of car mascots

== See also ==
- Lejeune, a surname; also LeJeune or Le Jeune
