= François Picolot =

French cyclist (1889–1926)

Personal information
- Born: 21 April 1889
- Died: 15 September 1926 (aged 37)

Cycling career
- Sport: Cycling
- Discipline: Road
- Role: Rider

François Picolot (21 April 1889 – 15 September 1926) was a French racing cyclist. He rode in the 1923 Tour de France.
