= Vincenzo Mantelli =

Italian cyclist

Personal information
- Born: 26 June 1889

Cycling career
- Sport: Cycling
- Discipline: Road
- Role: Rider

Vincenzo Mantelli (born 26 June 1889, date of death unknown) was an Italian racing cyclist. He rode in the 1923 Tour de France.
