= Charles Budts =

Belgian cyclist

Personal information
- Born: 9 March 1893

Cycling career
- Sport: Cycling
- Role: Rider

Charles Budts (born 9 March 1893 — date of death unknown) was a Belgian racing cyclist. He rode in the 1923 Tour de France.
