= Albert Colbec =

French cyclist

Personal information
- Born: 10 March 1884
- Died: 16 July 1966 (aged 82)

Cycling career
- Sport: Cycling
- Discipline: Road
- Role: Rider

Albert Colbec (10 March 1884 – 16 July 1966) was a French racing cyclist. He rode in the 1923 Tour de France.
