= Casati =

Casati is an Italian surname. Notable people with the surname include:

- Alessandro Casati (1881–1955), Italian academic, commentator and politician
- Ambrogio Casati (1897–1977), Italian painter
- Costanza Casati (born 1995), Italian writer
- Domenico Casati (born 1943), Italian retired professional football player
- Francesco Casati (1620–1702), Roman Catholic prelate
- Gabrio Casati (1798–1873), Italian politician
- Gaetano Casati (1838–1902), Italian explorer of Africa
- Giulio Casati (born 1942), Italian emeritus professor of Theoretical Physics
- Luisa Casati (1881–1957), Italian patroness of the arts
- Mario Casati (born 1944), Italian boxer
- Michelle Casati or Michelle Torres (born 1967), American retired professional tennis player
- Paolo Casati (1617–1707), Italian mathematician
- Pietro Casati (1891–1956), Italian racing cyclist

== See also ==
- Casati Stampa
