= Léon Poncelet =

Belgian cyclist

Personal information
- Born: 1 March 1885
- Died: 10 November 1978 (aged 93)

Cycling career
- Sport: Cycling
- Role: Rider

Léon Poncelet (1 March 1885 – 10 November 1978) was a Belgian racing cyclist. He rode in the 1922 Tour de France.
