= Émile Dorvilliers =

French cyclist

Personal information
- Born: 24 March 1890
- Died: 12 May 1970 (aged 80)

Cycling career
- Sport: Cycling
- Role: Rider

Émile Dorvilliers (24 March 1890 – 12 May 1970) was a French racing cyclist. He rode in the 1921 Tour de France.
