= Jacques Van Rompaey =

Belgian cyclist

Personal information
- Born: 28 December 1899
- Died: 30 June 1960 (aged 60)

Cycling career
- Sport: Cycling
- Role: Rider

Jacques Van Rompaey (28 December 1899 – 30 June 1960) was a Belgian racing cyclist. He rode in the 1921 Tour de France.
