= Fernand Braeckman =

Belgian cyclist

Personal information
- Born: 7 September 1899

Cycling career
- Sport: Cycling
- Role: Rider

Fernand Braeckman (born 7 September 1899, date of death unknown) was a Belgian racing cyclist. He rode in the 1922 Tour de France.
