= Émile Lejeune (footballer) =

Belgian footballer (1938–2024)

Personal information
- Date of birth: 17 February 1938
- Date of death: 28 December 2024 (aged 86)
- Position: Defender

Senior career*
Years	Team	Apps	(Gls)
1959-1971	RFC Liège	276	

International career
1960–1962	Belgium	10	(0)
- * Club domestic league appearances and goals

Émile Lejeune (17 February 1938 – 28 December 2024) was a Belgian footballer who played as a defender.

Lejeune spent his whole career at RFC Liège, playing 276 league matches for them between 1959 and 1971 and with whom he reached the 1964 Fairs Cup semi-finals, losing against the eventual winners Real Zaragoza.

He also made ten appearances for the Belgium national team from 1960 to 1962.

Lejeune died on 28 December 2024, at the age of 86.
