= François Magatti =

Swiss cyclist

Personal information
- Born: 1 September 1889

Cycling career
- Sport: Cycling
- Discipline: Road
- Role: Rider

François Magatti (born 1 September 1889, date of death unknown) was a Swiss racing cyclist. He rode in the 1924 Tour de France.
