= Émile Desterbecq =

Belgian cyclist

Personal information
- Born: 31 January 1890

Cycling career
- Sport: Cycling
- Role: Rider

Émile Desterbecq (born 31 January 1890, date of death unknown) was a Belgian racing cyclist. He rode in the 1922 Tour de France.
