= Marcel Brunie =

French cyclist

Personal information
- Born: 29 June 1894
- Died: 12 April 1977 (aged 82)

Cycling career
- Sport: Cycling
- Role: Rider

Marcel Brunie (29 June 1894 – 12 April 1977) was a French racing cyclist. He rode in the 1922 Tour de France.
