= Gottfried Burgat =

Swiss cyclist

Personal information
- Born: 1 May 1891

Cycling career
- Sport: Cycling
- Discipline: Road
- Role: Rider

Gottfried Burgat (born 1 May 1891, date of death unknown) was a Swiss racing cyclist. He rode in the 1924 Tour de France.
