= Jean Lejeune =

French priest

Jean Lejeune (1592 at Poligny, Jura – 19 August 1672, at Limoges) was a French Oratorian priest, known as a preacher. He lost his sight at the age of thirty-five, and he was known as "The Blind Father".

== Life ==
He was the son of a lawyer at Dole, of a family, which during the previous century had attained to a high position in the magistracy and was renowned for the piety and virtue of its members. Owing to the early loss of his father, his education devolved upon his mother who devoted herself to his spiritual advancement.

Having studied theology at the University of Dole, he fell under the influence of Berulle and entered the Oratory in 1614, three years after its foundation. He was appointed director of the seminary at Langres but soon found his vocation in mission work among the poor.

His life was unmarked by any external event except the loss of sight which occurred in 1627, while he was preaching the Lenten course at Rouen, but this caused no cessation in his work. The bishops employed him in preaching the Lent and Advent courses and the Government in the conversion of Protestants. He avoided the custom of treating controversial matter in the pulpit and confined himself to the exposition of fundamental truths. It was a novel idea of his to introduce after his discourses an abridgement of Christian doctrine. He also held conferences for the instruction of the clergy in his methods and was recommended by Massillon to young ecclesiastics for their imitation.

The French Oratory was suspected of Jansenism, and he was himself criticized on the ground that his preaching led to unsatisfactory results. In 1600 he appealed for advice to Antoine Arnauld, who ascribed these results to the laxity of confessors under the influence of casuistry, and dissuaded him from the design of abandoning his mission work.

== Works ==
His sermons in twelve volumes were published at Toulouse, Paris, and Rouen before his death, and a Latin translation at Mainz in 1667. There is an edition published at Lyons in 1826, but the latest and best edition is that of Peltier in ten volumes issued in 1889. Four volumes of extracts also appeared at Avignon in 1825 under title of "Pensées du P. Lejeune".
