= Raoul Boucher =

French cyclist

Personal information
- Born: Unknown Pont-Audemer, France
- Died: Unknown

Cycling career
- Sport: Cycling
- Role: Rider

Raoul Boucher was a French racing cyclist. He rode in the 1922 Tour de France.
