= Albert Boutinet =

French cyclist

Personal information
- Born: 7 June 1901
- Died: 20 December 1963 (aged 62)

Cycling career
- Sport: Cycling
- Discipline: Road
- Role: Rider

Albert Boutinet (7 June 1901 – 20 December 1963) was a French racing cyclist. He rode in the 1924 Tour de France.
