= Léon Bonnery =

French cyclist

Personal information
- Born: 28 February 1894
- Died: 11 January 1969 (aged 74)

Cycling career
- Sport: Cycling
- Role: Rider

Léon Bonnery (28 February 1894 – 11 January 1969) was a French racing cyclist. He rode in the 1921 Tour de France.
