= Luigi Brambilla =

Italian cyclist

Personal information
- Born: 6 April 1899
- Died: 29 April 1967 (aged 68)

Cycling career
- Sport: Cycling
- Discipline: Road
- Role: Rider

Luigi Brambilla (6 April 1899 – 29 April 1967) was an Italian racing cyclist. He rode in the 1924 Tour de France.
