= Colombo Gallorini =

Italian cyclist

Personal information
- Born: 3 June 1896
- Died: 13 January 1953 (aged 56) Castel del piano - Grosseto

Cycling career
- Sport: Cycling
- Discipline: Road
- Role: Rider

Colombo Gallorini (3 June 1896 – 13 January 1953) was an Italian racing cyclist. He rode in the 1924 Tour de France.
