= Marcel Simonet =

French cyclist

Personal information
- Born: 7 January 1902

Cycling career
- Sport: Cycling
- Discipline: Road
- Role: Rider

Marcel Simonet (born 7 January 1902, date of death unknown) was a French racing cyclist. He rode in the 1923 Tour de France.
