= Edmond Pertusot =

French cyclist

Personal information
- Born: 10 March 1890

Cycling career
- Sport: Cycling
- Role: Rider

Edmond Pertusot (born 10 March 1890, date of death unknown) was a French racing cyclist. He rode in the 1922 Tour de France.
