= André Zonnequin =

French cyclist

Personal information
- Born: 21 October 1896 Petit-Fort-Philippe, France
- Died: 19 September 1922 (aged 25) Paris, France

Cycling career
- Sport: Cycling
- Role: Rider

André Zonnequin (21 October 1896 – 19 September 1922) was a French racing cyclist. He rode in the 1922 Tour de France.
