= Jean Pennaneach =

French cyclist

Personal information
- Born: 20 June 1892

Cycling career
- Sport: Cycling
- Discipline: Road
- Role: Rider

Jean Pennaneach (born 20 June 1892, date of death unknown) was a French racing cyclist. He rode in the 1923 Tour de France.
