= Jean Benot =

French cyclist

Personal information
- Born: 22 May 1898

Cycling career
- Sport: Cycling
- Role: Rider

Jean Benot (born 22 May 1898, date of death unknown) was a French racing cyclist. He rode in the 1922 Tour de France.
