= Graimbouville =

- Commune
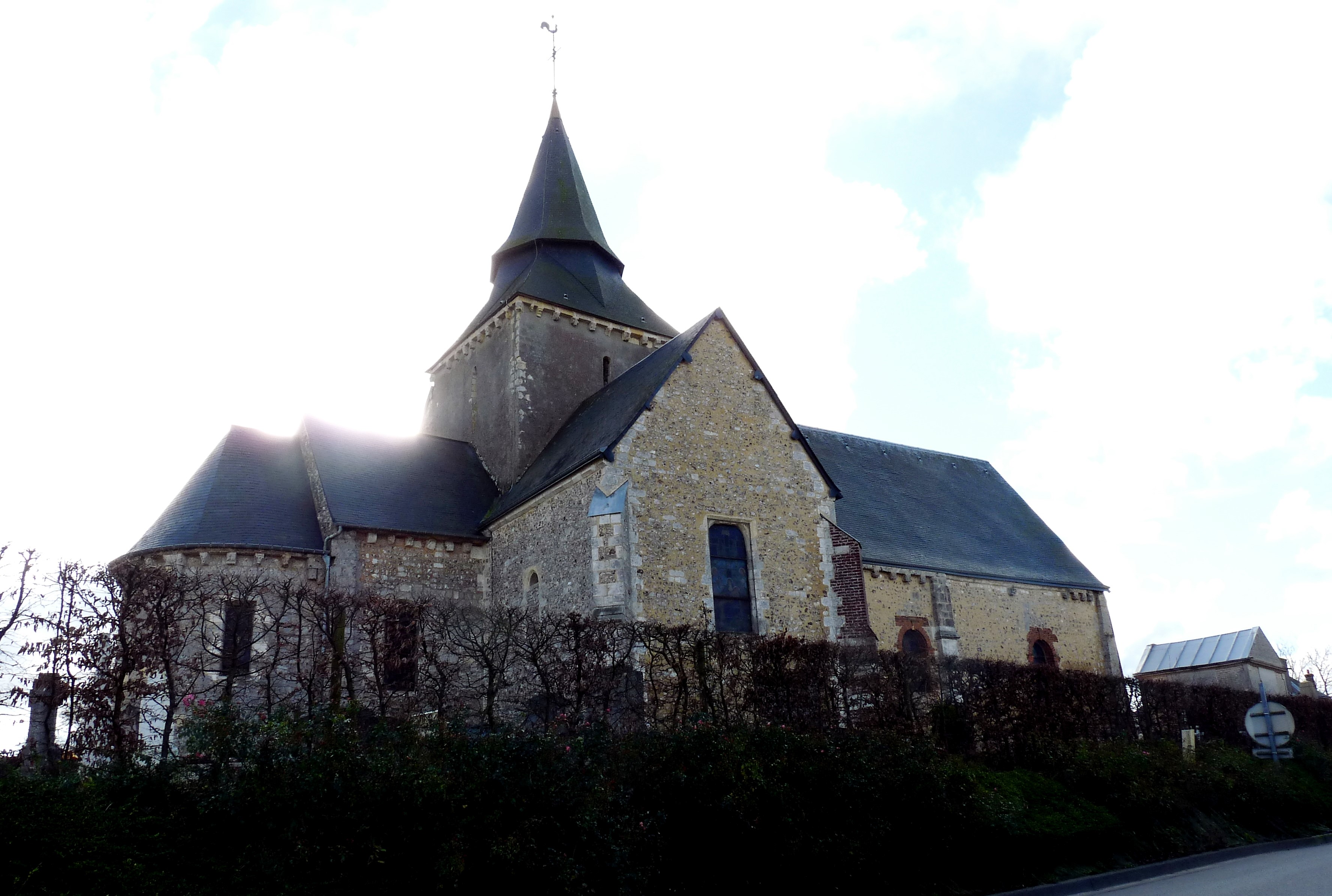
- The church in Graimbouville
- Location of Graimbouville
- Location within France Location within Normandy
- Coordinates: 49°34′25″N 0°19′48″E
- Country: France
- Region: Normandy
- Department: Seine-Maritime
- Arrondissement: Le Havre
- Canton: Saint-Romain-de-Colbosc
- Intercommunality: Le Havre Seine Métropole

Government
  - Mayor (2026–32): Sylvain Vasse
- Area^{1}: 6.4 km^{2} (2.5 sq mi)
- Elevation: 101 m (331 ft)
- Highest elevation: 127 m (417 ft)
- Lowest elevation: 98 m (322 ft)
- Population (2023): 604
  - Density: 94/km^{2} (240/sq mi)
- Time zone: UTC+01:00 (CET)
  - Summer (DST): UTC+02:00 (CEST)
- INSEE/Postal code: 76314 /76430
- ^{1} French Land Register data, which excludes lakes, ponds, glaciers > 1 km^{2} (0.386 sq mi or 247 acres) and river estuaries.

Graimbouville (French pronunciation: [ɡʁɛ̃buvil]) is a commune in the Seine-Maritime department in the Normandy region in northern France.

== Geography ==
A farming village situated in the Pays de Caux, some 13 miles (21 km) northeast of Le Havre, at the junction of the D234 and D434 roads. The A29 autoroute passes through the southern tip of the commune.

== Population ==
Historical population
Year	Pop.	±% p.a.
1968	315	—
1975	390	+3.10%
1982	375	−0.56%
1990	409	+1.09%
1999	496	+2.17%
2007	574	+1.84%
2012	617	+1.46%
2017	615	−0.06%
2023	604	−0.30%
Source: INSEE

== Places of interest ==
- The church of St. Pierre & St.Paul, dating from the eleventh century.
- The motte of a 12th-century castle.
- The sixteenth century chateau de Goutimesnil.

== See also ==
- Communes of the Seine-Maritime department
