= Jules Beyens =

Belgian cyclist (1884–1974)

Personal information
- Born: 24 December 1884 Genval, Belgium
- Died: 5 July 1974 (aged 89) Uccle, Belgium

Cycling career
- Sport: Cycling
- Role: Rider

Jules Beyens (24 December 1884 – 5 July 1974) was a Belgian racing cyclist. He rode in the 1921 Tour de France.
