= Caroline Lejeune (skater) =

Personal information
- Full name: Caroline Lejeune
- Nickname: Clochette (Tinker Bell)
- Nationality: French
- Born: July 11, 1986 (age 40) Bayonne, France
- Height: 1.60 m (5 ft 3 in)
- Weight: 47 kg (104 lb; 7.4 st)
- Website: Official Site

Sport
- Country: France
- Sport: Inline skating
- Event: Freestyle slalom
- Club: MUC
- Coached by: Guillaume Barbaz (alias Skali)
- Retired: 2010

Achievements and titles
- World finals: Worldchampion 2008, 2007; World Cup 2009, 2008, 2007
Medal record
Gold medal – first place	2009 IFSA Worldchampion	France
Gold medal – first place	2008 IFSA Worldchampion	Russia
Gold medal – first place	2007 IFSA Worldchampion	Italy
Bronze medal – third place	2006 IFSA Worldchampion	Spain

Caroline Lejeune is a female freestyle slalom skater in the IFSA (International Freestyle Skaters Association). She was three times world champion.

== Biography ==
Lejeune started ice skating when she was six years old. When she was eleven she first tried inline skating which she practiced for a number of years. She remained in ice skating, also doing dance and artistic skating. In 2005 Lejeune devoted herself to inline skating. She was coached by Skali who taught her freestyle slalom. In 2006, she began seriously taking part in competitions.

Lejeune is currently (2010) the president of her club and in the Powerslide team. Formally she is no longer taking part in competitions but focuses on other aspects of the sport. She is still making videos and doing exhibitions. She is also very active within the IFSA. Lejeune resides in Montpellier, France.

== Achievements ==
Only the most important events are listed

Year	Tournament	Country	Result	Class
2009	IFSA World Championship	France	3rd	Free style slalom
2009	World Cup	Overall	1st	Free style slalom
2009	National Championship	France	1st	Free style slalom
2008	IFSA World Championship	Russia	1st	Free style slalom
2008	World Cup	Overall	1st	Free style slalom
2008	National Championship	France	2nd	Free style slalom
2007	IFSA World Championship	Italy	1st	Free style slalom
2007	World Cup	Overall	1st	Free style slalom
2007	National Championship	France	1st	Free style slalom
2006	IFSA World Championship	Spain	3rd	Free style slalom
2006	World Cup	Overall	2nd	Free style slalom
2006	National Championship	France	3rd	Free style slalom
