= Marcel Thoreau =

French cyclist

Personal information
- Born: 20 August 1896
- Died: 4 May 1964 (aged 67)

Cycling career
- Sport: Cycling
- Role: Rider

Marcel Thoreau (20 August 1896 – 4 May 1964) was a French racing cyclist. He rode in the 1922 Tour de France.
