= Robert Martens =

French cyclist

Personal information
- Born: 4 November 1899

Cycling career
- Sport: Cycling
- Role: Rider

Robert Martens (born 4 November 1899, date of death unknown) was a French racing cyclist. He rode in the 1921 Tour de France.
