= André Pompon =

French cyclist

Personal information
- Born: 2 July 1904
- Died: 11 October 1967 (aged 63)

Cycling career
- Sport: Cycling
- Discipline: Road
- Role: Rider

André Pompon (2 July 1904 – 11 October 1967) was a French racing cyclist. He rode in the 1924 Tour de France.
