= Léon Braeckeveldt =

Belgian cyclist

Personal information
- Born: 20 February 1894
- Died: 19 February 1973 (aged 78)

Cycling career
- Sport: Cycling
- Role: Rider

Léon Braeckeveldt (20 February 1894 – 19 February 1973) was a Belgian racing cyclist. He rode in the 1922 Tour de France.
