= Alexandre Bontoux =

French cyclist

Personal information
- Born: 5 October 1891

Cycling career
- Sport: Cycling
- Discipline: Road
- Role: Rider

Alexandre Bontoux (born 5 October 1891, date of death unknown) was a French racing cyclist. He rode in the 1924 Tour de France.
