= Alexandre Baud =

French cyclist

Personal information
- Born: 8 August 1897
- Died: 2 August 1932 (aged 35)

Cycling career
- Sport: Cycling
- Discipline: Road
- Role: Rider

Alexandre Baud (8 August 1897 – 2 August 1932) was a French racing cyclist. He rode in the 1923 Tour de France.
