= Armand Thewis =

Belgian cyclist

Personal information
- Born: 18 April 1893
- Died: 14 January 1960 (aged 66)

Cycling career
- Sport: Cycling
- Role: Rider

Armand Thewis (18 April 1893 – 14 January 1960) was a Belgian racing cyclist. He rode in the 1921 Tour de France.
