= Alexandre Dupontreue =

French cyclist

Personal information
- Born: 20 April 1892
- Died: 13 December 1951 (aged 59)

Cycling career
- Sport: Cycling
- Role: Rider

Alexandre Dupontreue (20 April 1892 – 13 December 1951) was a French racing cyclist. He rode in the 1922 Tour de France.
