= Marcel Allain (cyclist) =

French cyclist

Personal information
- Born: 28 May 1888 Colombes, France
- Died: 23 December 1944 (aged 56) Colombes, France

Cycling career
- Sport: Cycling
- Discipline: Road
- Role: Rider

Marcel Allain (French pronunciation: [maʁsɛl alɛ̃]; 28 May 1888 – 23 December 1944) was a French racing cyclist. He rode in the 1913, 1914 and 1923 Tour de France.
