= Alfred Noullez =

French cyclist

Personal information
- Born: 15 May 1901
- Died: 28 March 1964 (aged 62)

Cycling career
- Sport: Cycling
- Discipline: Road
- Role: Rider

Alfred Noullez (15 May 1901 – 28 March 1964) was a French racing cyclist. He rode in the 1924 Tour de France.
