= Roger Marye =

French cyclist

Personal information
- Born: 19 August 1897

Cycling career
- Sport: Cycling
- Role: Rider

Roger Marye (born 19 August 1897, date of death unknown) was a French racing cyclist. He rode in the 1922 Tour de France.
