= Maurice Charreire =

French cyclist

Personal information
- Born: 3 November 1894
- Died: 10 October 1978 (aged 83)

Cycling career
- Sport: Cycling
- Role: Rider

Maurice Charreire (3 November 1894 – 10 October 1978) was a French racing cyclist. He rode in the 1922 Tour de France.
