= Auguste Berthault =

French cyclist

Personal information
- Born: 27 July 1878
- Died: 30 May 1958 (aged 79)

Cycling career
- Sport: Cycling
- Role: Rider

Auguste Berthault (27 July 1878 – 30 May 1958) was a French racing cyclist. He rode in the 1922 Tour de France.
