= Joseph Bercegeay =

French cyclist

Personal information
- Born: 10 December 1896
- Died: 14 May 1958 (aged 61)

Cycling career
- Sport: Cycling
- Discipline: Road
- Role: Rider

Joseph Bercegeay (10 December 1896 – 14 May 1958) was a French racing cyclist. He rode in the 1923 Tour de France.
