= Eugène Nicolle =

French cyclist

Personal information
- Born: 16 April 1890
- Died: unknown

Cycling career
- Sport: Cycling
- Role: Rider

Eugène Nicolle (born 16 April 1890, date of death unknown) was a French racing cyclist. He rode in the 1922 Tour de France.
