= Émile Dalifard =

French cyclist

Personal information
- Born: 22 August 1888
- Died: 14 September 1961 (aged 73)

Cycling career
- Sport: Cycling
- Role: Rider

Émile Dalifard (22 August 1888 – 14 September 1961) was a French racing cyclist. He rode in the 1921 Tour de France.
