= Maurive Protin =

Belgian cyclist

Personal information
- Born: 1 May 1899
- Died: 11 March 1994 (aged 94)

Cycling career
- Sport: Cycling
- Role: Rider

Maurive Protin (1 May 1899 – 11 March 1994) was a Belgian racing cyclist. He rode in the 1923 Tour de France.
