= Mario Verzeletti =

Italian cyclist (1893–??)

Personal information
- Born: 17 May 1893

Cycling career
- Sport: Cycling
- Role: Rider

Mario Verzeletti (born 17 May 1893, date of death unknown) was an Italian racing cyclist. He rode in the 1921 Tour de France.
