= Jules Lebreton (cyclist) =

French cyclist

Personal information
- Born: 7 May 1890
- Died: 20 January 1982 (aged 91)

Team information
- Role: Rider

Jules Lebreton (7 May 1890 – 20 January 1982) was a French racing cyclist who rode in the 1921 Tour de France.
