= Pierre Bachellerie =

French cyclist

Personal information
- Born: 22 December 1898
- Died: 31 December 1991 (aged 93)

Cycling career
- Sport: Cycling
- Discipline: Road
- Role: Rider

Pierre Bachellerie (22 December 1898 – 31 December 1991) was a French racing cyclist. He rode in the 1924 Tour de France.
