= Felix Richard =

French cyclist

Personal information
- Born: 28 May 1900
- Died: 23 April 1968 (aged 67)

Cycling career
- Sport: Cycling
- Discipline: Road
- Role: Rider

Felix Richard (28 May 1900 – 23 April 1968) was a French racing cyclist. He rode in the 1923 Tour de France.
