= Charles Arnulf =

French cyclist

Personal information
- Born: 16 November 1892
- Died: 1 March 1958 (aged 65)

Cycling career
- Sport: Cycling
- Discipline: Road
- Role: Rider

Charles Arnulf (16 November 1892 – 1 March 1958) was a French racing cyclist. He rode in the 1923 Tour de France.
