= Giuseppe Ercolani =

Italian cyclist

Personal information
- Born: 13 October 1901
- Died: 19 March 1985 (aged 83)

Cycling career
- Sport: Cycling
- Discipline: Road
- Role: Rider

Giuseppe Ercolani (13 October 1901 – 19 March 1985) was an Italian racing cyclist. He rode in the 1923 Tour de France.
