= Julien Noth =

French cyclist

Personal information
- Born: 1889 Paris, France
- Died: Unknown

Cycling career
- Sport: Cycling
- Role: Rider

Julien Noth was a French racing cyclist. He rode in the 1922 Tour de France.
