= Lucien Abbe =

French cyclist

Personal information
- Born: 22 December 1883 Argences, France
- Died: 22 February 1946 (aged 62) Caen, France

Cycling career
- Sport: Cycling
- Role: Rider

Lucien Abbe (22 December 1883 – 22 February 1946) was a French racing cyclist. He rode in the 1921 Tour de France.
