= Lorenzo Costa (cyclist) =

Italian cyclist

Personal information
- Born: Unknown
- Died: Unknown

Cycling career
- Sport: Cycling
- Role: Rider

Lorenzo Costa was an Italian racing cyclist. He rode in the 1922 Tour de France.
