= Edgard Roy =

French cyclist (1894–1973)

Personal information
- Born: 2 December 1894 Embourie, France
- Died: 7 June 1973 (aged 78) Saint-Michel, France
- Height: 1.55 m (5 ft 1 in)
- Weight: 52 kg (115 lb)

Cycling career
- Sport: Cycling
- Discipline: Road
- Role: Rider

Edgard Roy (2 December 1894 – 7 June 1973) was a French professional road cyclist who competed during the late 1910s and early 1920s. He achieved notable results in long-distance classics such as Bordeaux–Paris and competed four times in the Tour de France.

== Career ==
Roy was born in Embourie, France in 1894. He competed in four editions of the Tour de France, starting in 1919. His best overall result came in the 1922 Tour de France, where he finished 22nd in the general classification.

He achieved two top-10 results in the long-distance classic Bordeaux–Paris, finishing 5th in 1921 and 9th in 1922. He also competed in other main international cycling races, including the Circuit De Paris, 1922 edition and 1923 edition of Paris–Tours.

== Major results ==
1919
14th Circuit De Paris
1921
5th Bordeaux–Paris
28th Overall Tour de France
1922
9th Bordeaux–Paris
22nd Overall Tour de France

=== Grand Tour general classification results ===
Race	1919	1921	1922	1923
Tour de France	DNF	28th	22nd	31st

=== Classic races results ===
Race	1921	1922	1923
Bordeaux–Paris	5th	9th	—
Paris–Tours	—	41st	DNF
