= Albert Rousselle =

French cyclist

Personal information
- Born: Unknown Clichy, France
- Died: Unknown

Cycling career
- Sport: Cycling
- Role: Rider

Albert Rousselle was a French racing cyclist. He rode in the 1922 Tour de France.
