= Giuseppe Ruffoni =

Italian cyclist

Personal information
- Born: 16 December 1895
- Died: 28 December 1959 (aged 64)

Cycling career
- Sport: Cycling
- Discipline: Road
- Role: Rider

Giuseppe Ruffoni (16 December 1895 – 28 December 1959) was an Italian racing cyclist. He rode in the 1923 Tour de France.
