= Benjamin Mortier =

Belgian cyclist

Personal information
- Born: 19 May 1891

Cycling career
- Sport: Cycling
- Role: Rider

Benjamin Mortier (born 19 May 1891, date of death unknown) was a Belgian racing cyclist. He rode in the 1923 Tour de France.
