= Alfred De Busschere =

Belgian cyclist

Personal information
- Born: 15 November 1891
- Died: 3 April 1977 (aged 85)

Cycling career
- Sport: Cycling
- Role: Rider

Alfred De Busschere (15 November 1891 – 3 April 1977) was a Belgian racing cyclist. He rode in the 1922 Tour de France.
