= Jean Archelais =

French cyclist

Personal information
- Born: 2 January 1897 Joigny, France
- Died: 18 December 1957 (aged 60) La Baule-Escoublac, France

Cycling career
- Sport: Cycling
- Role: Rider

Jean Archelais (2 January 1897 – 18 December 1957) was a French racing cyclist. He rode in the 1922 Tour de France.
