= Jules Banino =

French cyclist

Personal information
- Born: 16 November 1872
- Died: 12 June 1947 (aged 74)

Cycling career
- Sport: Cycling
- Role: Rider

Jules Banino (16 November 1872 – 12 June 1947) was a French racing cyclist. He rode in the 1921 Tour de France.
