= Georges Davoine =

French cyclist

Personal information
- Born: 22 June 1896 Paris, France
- Died: 24 April 1977 (aged 80) Corbeil-Essonnes

Cycling career
- Sport: Cycling
- Role: Rider

Georges Davoine was a French racing cyclist. He rode in the 1922 Tour de France.
