= Pietro Casati =

Italian cyclist

Personal information
- Born: 12 October 1891
- Died: 2 February 1956 (aged 64)

Cycling career
- Sport: Cycling
- Role: Rider

Pietro Casati (12 October 1891 – 2 February 1956) was an Italian racing cyclist. He rode in the 1921 Tour de France.
