= Silvio Borsetti =

Italian cyclist

Personal information
- Born: 24 March 1888 Portomaggiore, Kingdom of Italy

Cycling career
- Sport: Cycling
- Role: Rider

Silvio Borsetti (born 24 March 1888, date of death unknown) was an Italian racing cyclist. He rode in the 1921 Tour de France.
