= Louis Verbraecken =

Belgian cyclist

Personal information
- Born: 9 March 1891

Cycling career
- Sport: Cycling
- Role: Rider

Louis Verbraecken (9 March 1891, date of death unknown) was a Belgian racing cyclist. He rode in the 1921 Tour de France.
