= Joseph Rayen =

French cyclist

Personal information
- Born: 9 January 1891

Cycling career
- Sport: Cycling
- Role: Rider

Joseph Rayen (born 9 January 1891, date of death unknown) was a French racing cyclist. He rode in the 1921 Tour de France.
