= Maurice Guenot =

French cyclist

Maurice Guénot
Personal information
- Born: 1889 Paris, France
- Died: Unknown

Cycling career
- Sport: Cycling
- Role: Rider

Maurice Guénot was a French racing cyclist. He rode in the 1922 Tour de France.
