= Émile Lejeune (cyclist) =

French cyclist

Personal information
- Born: 26 February 1895
- Died: 9 January 1973 (aged 77)

Cycling career
- Sport: Cycling
- Role: Rider

Émile Lejeune (26 February 1895 – 9 January 1973) was a French racing cyclist. He rode in the 1921 Tour de France.
