= Laurent Devalle =

Monegasque cyclist (1892–1965)

Personal information
- Born: 15 January 1892
- Died: 22 July 1965 (aged 73)

Cycling career
- Sport: Cycling
- Role: Rider

Laurent Devalle (15 January 1892 – 22 July 1965) was a Monegasque racing cyclist. He rode in the Tour de France in 1921, 1922 and 1924. He was the first Monegasque rider to finish the Tour de France in 1922.
