= Daniel Masson (cyclist) =

French cyclist

Personal information
- Full name: Daniel Masson
- Born: April 1897 France

Cycling career
- Sport: Cycling
- Role: Rider

Daniel Eugène Masson (born April 1897, date of death unknown) was a French racing cyclist. He finished in last place in the 1922 and 1923 Tour de France.
