= Clotaire Guillon =

French cyclist

Personal information
- Born: 5 January 1890
- Died: 20 October 1942 (aged 52)

Cycling career
- Sport: Cycling
- Role: Rider

Clotaire Guillon (5 January 1890 – 20 October 1942) was a French racing cyclist. He rode in the 1921 Tour de France.
