= Antoine Rière =

French cyclist

Personal information
- Born: 16 December 1891
- Died: 12 February 1927 (aged 35)

Cycling career
- Sport: Cycling
- Discipline: Road
- Role: Rider

Antoine Rière (16 December 1891 – 12 February 1927) was a French racing cyclist. He rode in the 1923 Tour de France.
