= Paul Denis (cyclist) =

French cyclist

Personal information
- Born: 23 April 1899

Cycling career
- Sport: Cycling
- Role: Rider

Paul Denis (born 23 April 1899, date of death unknown) was a French racing cyclist. He rode in the 1922 Tour de France.
