= Vincenzo Bianco =

Italian cyclist (1899–1975)

Personal information
- Born: 2 August 1899
- Died: 27 July 1975 (aged 75)

Cycling career
- Sport: Cycling
- Role: Rider

Vincenzo Bianco (2 August 1899 – 27 July 1975) was an Italian racing cyclist. He rode in the 1922 Tour de France.
