= Henri Miège =

Swiss cyclist

Personal information
- Born: 25 December 1894

Cycling career
- Sport: Cycling
- Role: Rider

Henri Miège (born 25 December 1894, date of death unknown) was a Swiss racing cyclist. He rode in the 1921 Tour de France.
