= Henri Collé =

Swiss cyclist (1893–1976)

Personal information
- Born: 23 November 1893
- Died: 13 November 1976 (aged 82)

Cycling career
- Sport: Cycling
- Role: Rider

Henri Collé (23 November 1893 – 13 November 1976) was a Swiss racing cyclist. He rode in the 1921 Tour de France.
