= Joseph Muller (cyclist) =

French cyclist

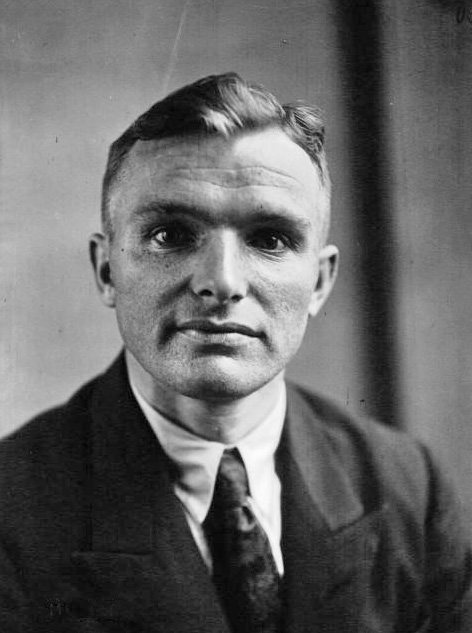
- Joseph Müller in 1924

Personal information
- Full name: Joseph Muller
- Born: 9 March 1895 Orschwiller, France
- Died: 8 May 1975 (aged 80) Lamarche, France

Cycling career
- Sport: Cycling
- Discipline: Road
- Role: Rider

Major wins
- One stage 1923 Tour de France

Joseph Muller (Orschwiller, 9 March 1895 — Lamarche, 8 May 1975) was a French professional road bicycle racer. He rode and finished the Tour de France from 1920 to 1924, winning one stage in the 1923 Tour de France and finishing 6th in the 1924 Tour de France.

== Major results ==
1923
Tour de France:

Winner stage 12

1924
Paris-Nancy
