= Romain Bellenger =

French cyclist (1894–1981)

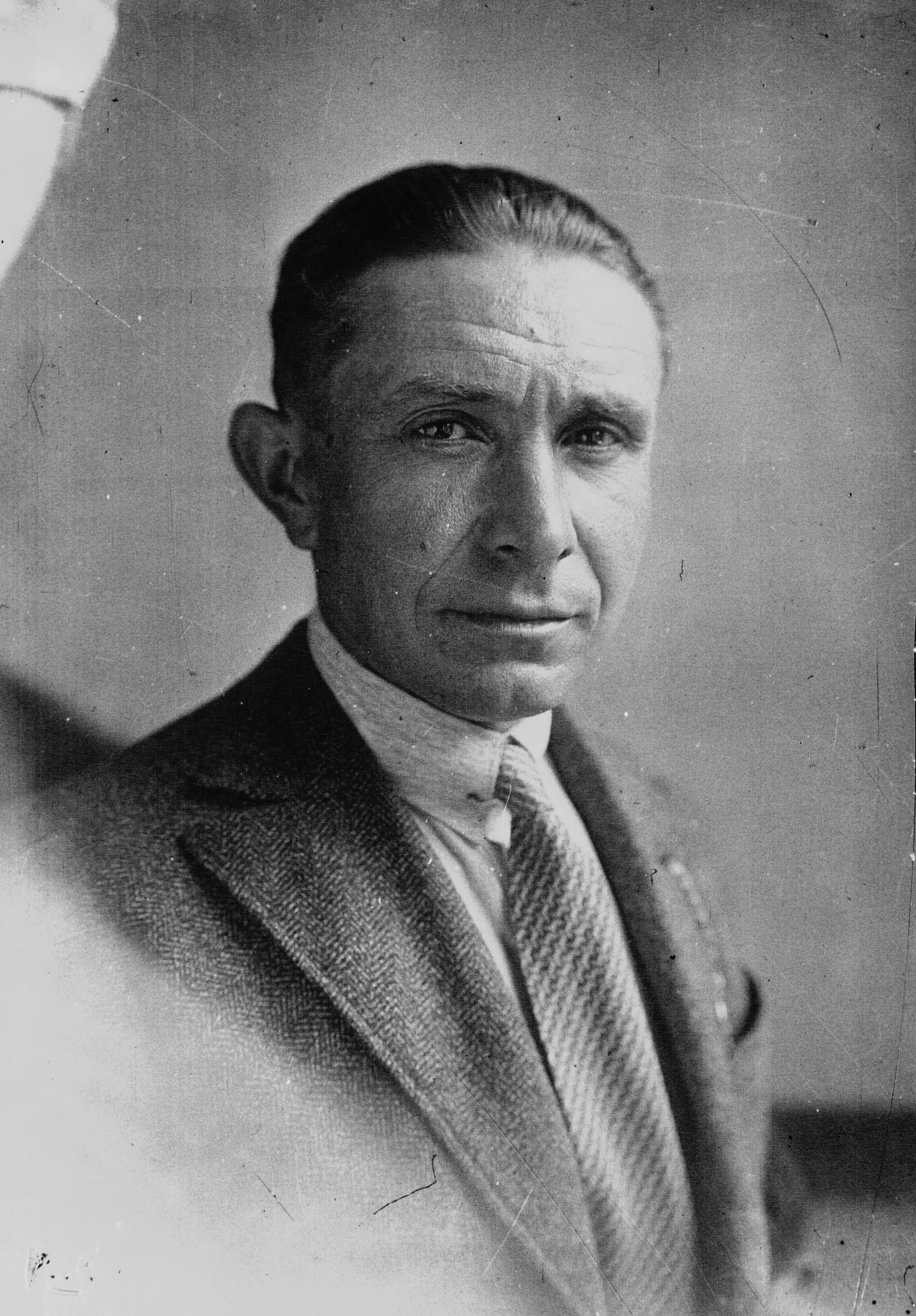

Personal information
- Full name: Romain Bellenger
- Born: 18 January 1894 Paris, France
- Died: 25 November 1981 (aged 87) Cahors, France

Cycling career
- Sport: Cycling
- Discipline: Road
- Role: Rider

Major wins
- Three stages Tour de France

Romain Bellenger (Paris, 18 January 1894 — Cahors, 25 November 1981) was a French road racing cyclist who came third in the 1923 Tour de France and eighth in the 1924 Tour de France and won three stages.

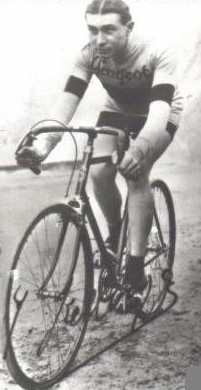
Romain Bellenger

== Major results ==
1919
Circuit de Paris
1920
Circuit des villes d'eaux d'Auvergne
Criterium des Aiglons
Paris-Dunkerque
Paris-Nancy
1921
Tour de France:

Winner stage 2

Circuit de Paris
1922
Tour de France:

Winner stage 2

1923
Tour de France:

3rd, Overall classification
Winner stage 13
Yellow jersey, After Stages 4 and 5

Tour du Vaucluse
1924
Tour de France:

8th, Overall classification
1st, Stage 2 (371 km)
1st, Stage 14 (433 km)

1925
Tour de France:

Winner stage 2

Giro della provincia Milano (joint with Achille Souchard
1927
Paris-Lille
1928
Paris-Chateauroux
Paris-Lille
