= Alfons Standaert =

Belgian cyclist

Personal information
- Born: 24 December 1894
- Died: 2 April 1968 (aged 73)

Cycling career
- Sport: Cycling
- Role: Rider

Alfons Standaert (24 December 1894 – 2 April 1968) was a Belgian racing cyclist. He rode in the 1922 Tour de France.
