= Camille Botté =

Belgian cyclist (1888–1972)

Personal information
- Born: 6 October 1888 Ressaix, Belgium
- Died: 9 December 1972 (aged 84) Reserve Mines, Nova Scotia, Canada

Cycling career
- Sport: Cycling
- Role: Rider

Camille Botté (6 October 1888 – 9 December 1972) was a Belgian racing cyclist. He won the Isole division of the 1914 Tour de France.

He raced again in 1922 but finished lower

He emigrated to Canada with his family after this and remained there for the rest of his life.
