= Joseph Normand =

French cyclist

Personal information
- Born: 4 December 1894
- Died: 25 May 1979 (aged 84)

Cycling career
- Sport: Cycling
- Role: Rider

Joseph Normand (4 December 1894 – 25 May 1979) was a French racing cyclist. He rode in the 1920 Tour de France.
