= Robert Jacquinot =

French cyclist

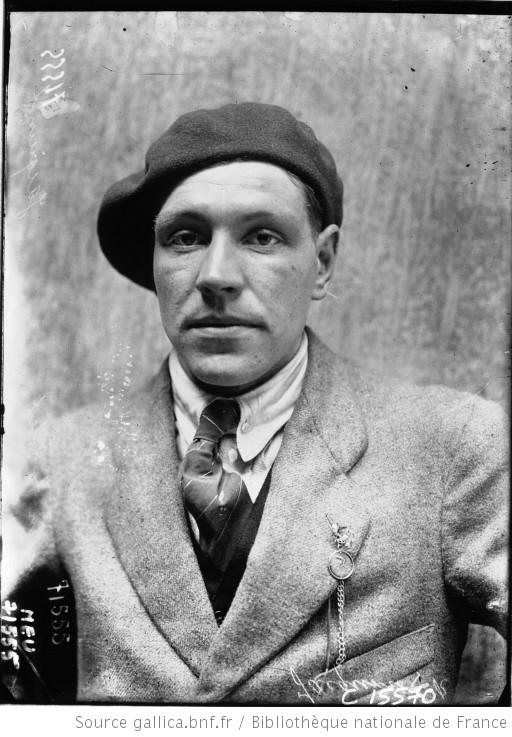

Personal information
- Full name: Robert Jacquinot
- Born: 31 December 1893 France
- Died: 17 June 1980 (aged 86)

Cycling career
- Sport: Cycling
- Current team: Retired
- Discipline: Road
- Role: Rider

Major wins
- Tour de France 4 Stages 4 days yellow jersey

Robert Jacquinot (pronounced [ʁɔbɛʁ ʒakino]; 31 December 1893–17 June 1980) was a French road racing cyclist, who won two stages in the 1922 Tour de France and 2 stages in the 1923 Tour de France, and wore the yellow jersey for a total of four days. He was born in Aubervilliers, Seine-Saint-Denis and died in Bobigny.

== Major results ==
1922
Circuit de Champagne
Tour de France:

Winner stages 1 and 3
Wearing yellow jersey for three days

1923
Paris - Saint-Etienne
Tour de France:

Winner stages 1 and 5
Wearing yellow jersey for one day

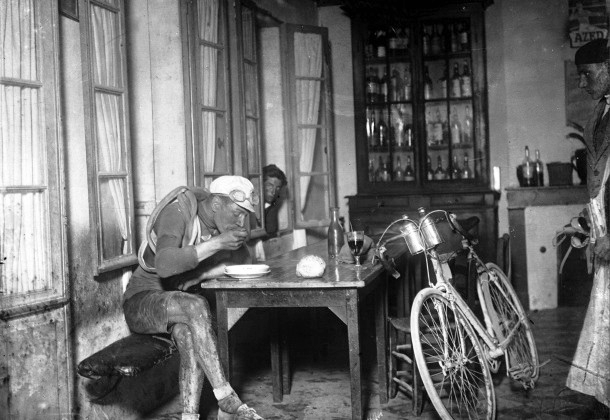
Robert Jacquinot taking a break to eat at a cafe in Hostens during stage 5, Les Sables d'Olonne – Bayonne, 3 July 1922
