= 1924 Tour de France, Stage 1 to Stage 8 =

Cycling race stages

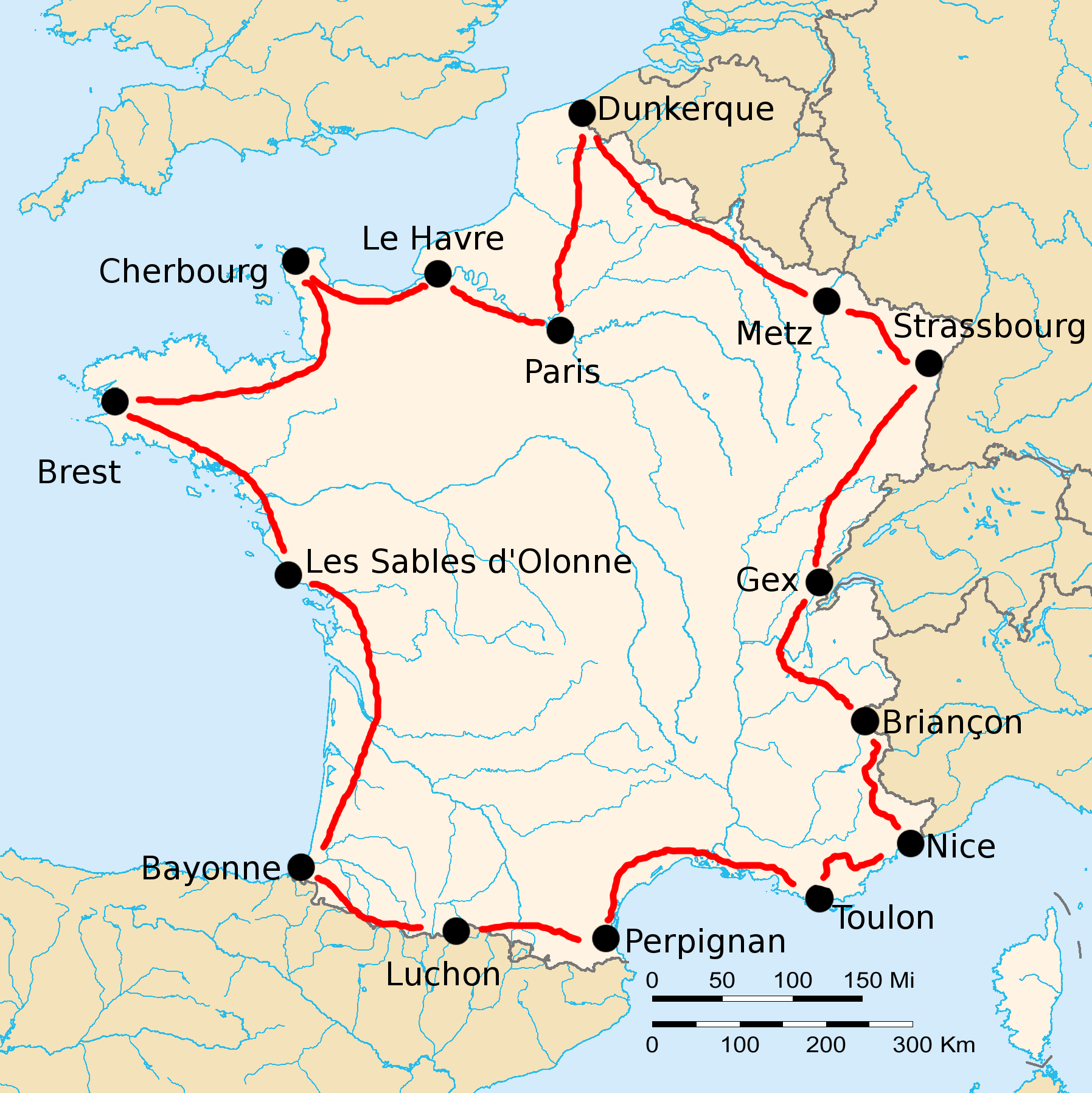
Route of the 1924 Tour de France

The 1924 Tour de France was the 18th edition of Tour de France, one of cycling's Grand Tours. The Tour began in Paris with a flat stage on 22 June, and Stage 8 occurred on 6 July with a flat stage to Toulon. The race finished in Paris on 20 July.

== Stage 1 ==
22 June 1924 — Paris to Le Havre, 381 km (237 mi)

Stage 1 result and general classification after stage 1

Rank	Rider	Time
1	Ottavio Bottecchia (ITA)	15h 03' 14"
2	Maurice Ville (FRA)	s.t.
3	Félix Sellier (BEL)	s.t.
4	Henri Pélissier (FRA)	s.t.
5	Nicolas Frantz (LUX)	s.t.
6	Giovanni Brunero (ITA)	s.t.
7	Hector Tiberghien (BEL)	s.t.
8	Honoré Barthélémy (FRA)	s.t.
9	Cyriel Omeye (BEL)	s.t.
10	Léon Scieur (BEL)	s.t.

== Stage 2 ==
24 June 1924 — Le Havre to Cherbourg-en-Cotentin, 371 km (231 mi)

Stage 2 result

Rank	Rider	Time
1	Romain Bellenger (FRA)	14h 34' 31"
2	Maurice Ville (FRA)	s.t.
3	Nicolas Frantz (LUX)	s.t.
4	Robert Jacquinot (FRA)	s.t.
5	Jules Huyvaert (BEL)	s.t.
6	Louis Mottiat (BEL)	s.t.
7	Félix Sellier (BEL)	+ 24"
8	René Gerard (FRA)	s.t.
9	Fernand Lemay (FRA)	s.t.
10	Georges Cuvelier (FRA)	s.t.

General classification after stage 2

Rank	Rider	Time
1	Ottavio Bottecchia (ITA)	
2	Maurice Ville (FRA)	+ 2' 36"
3	Nicolas Frantz (LUX)	s.t.
4		
5		
6		
7		
8		
9		
10		

== Stage 3 ==
26 June 1924 — Cherbourg-en-Cotentin to Brest, 405 km (252 mi)

Stage 3 result

Rank	Rider	Time
=1	Théophile Beeckman (BEL)	15h 44' 00"
=1	Philippe Thys (BEL)	s.t.
3	Raymond Englebert (BEL)	s.t.
4	Romain Bellenger (FRA)	s.t.
5	Arsène Alancourt (FRA)	s.t.
6	Ottavio Bottecchia (ITA)	s.t.
7	Nicolas Frantz (LUX)	s.t.
8	Georges Cuvelier (FRA)	s.t.
9	Léon Scieur (BEL)	s.t.
10	Jean Alavoine (FRA)	s.t.

General classification after stage 3

Rank	Rider	Time
=1	Ottavio Bottecchia (ITA)	
=1	Théophile Beeckman (BEL)	s.t.
3	Nicolas Frantz (LUX)	+ 2' 36"
4		
5		
6		
7		
8		
9		
10		

== Stage 4 ==
28 June 1924 — Brest to Les Sables-d'Olonne, 412 km (256 mi)

Stage 4 result

Rank	Rider	Time
1	Félix Goethals (FRA)	16h 28' 51"
2	Romain Bellenger (FRA)	s.t.
3	Théophile Beeckman (BEL)	s.t.
4	Louis Mottiat (BEL)	s.t.
5	Ottavio Bottecchia (ITA)	s.t.
6	Eugène Dhers (FRA)	s.t.
7	Victor Fontan (FRA)	s.t.
8	Gaston Degy (FRA)	s.t.
9	Georges Cuvelier (FRA)	s.t.
10	Honoré Barthélémy (FRA)	s.t.

General classification after stage 4

Rank	Rider	Time
=1	Ottavio Bottecchia (ITA)	
=1	Théophile Beeckman (BEL)	s.t.
3	Léon Scieur (BEL)	+ 3' 00"
4		
5		
6		
7		
8		
9		
10		

== Stage 5 ==
30 June 1924 — Les Sables-d'Olonne to Bayonne, 482 km (300 mi)

Stage 5 result

Rank	Rider	Time
1	Omer Huyse (BEL)	19h 40' 00"
2	Ottavio Bottecchia (ITA)	+ 1' 11"
3	Giovanni Brunero (ITA)	s.t.
4	Romain Bellenger (FRA)	s.t.
5	Lucien Rich (FRA)	s.t.
6	Arsène Alancourt (FRA)	s.t.
7	Bartolomeo Aimo (ITA)	s.t.
8	Louis Mottiat (BEL)	s.t.
9	Hector Tiberghien (BEL)	s.t.
10	Gaston Degy (FRA)	s.t.

General classification after stage 5

Rank	Rider	Time
1	Ottavio Bottecchia (ITA)	
=2	Léon Scieur (BEL)	+ 3' 00"
=2	Giovanni Brunero (ITA)	s.t.
=2	Hector Tiberghien (BEL)	s.t.
5		
6		
7		
8		
9		
10		

== Stage 6 ==
2 July 1924 — Bayonne to Luchon, 326 km (203 mi)

Stage 6 result

Rank	Rider	Time
1	Ottavio Bottecchia (ITA)	15h 24' 25"
2	Lucien Buysse (BEL)	+ 18' 58"
3	Louis Mottiat (BEL)	+ 33' 27"
4	Nicolas Frantz (LUX)	+ 35' 34"
5	Théophile Beeckman (BEL)	+ 36' 16"
6	Marcel Huot (FRA)	+ 42' 12"
7	Giovanni Brunero (ITA)	+ 47' 40"
8	Romain Bellenger (FRA)	+ 54' 58"
9	Omer Huyse (BEL)	s.t.
10	Georges Cuvelier (FRA)	+ 56' 34"

General classification after stage 6

Rank	Rider	Time
1	Ottavio Bottecchia (ITA)	
2	Lucien Buysse (BEL)	+ 30' 21"
3	Nicolas Frantz (LUX)	+ 42' 15"
4		
5		
6		
7		
8		
9		
10		

== Stage 7 ==
4 July 1924 — Luchon to Perpignan, 323 km (201 mi)

Stage 7 result

Rank	Rider	Time
1	Ottavio Bottecchia (ITA)	12h 40' 18"
2	Philippe Thys (BEL)	s.t.
3	Arsène Alancourt (FRA)	s.t.
4	Nicolas Frantz (LUX)	+ 3' 48"
5	Giovanni Brunero (ITA)	s.t.
6	Bartolomeo Aimo (ITA)	s.t.
7	Marcel Huot (FRA)	s.t.
8	Hector Tiberghien (BEL)	s.t.
9	Louis Mottiat (BEL)	+ 11' 58"
10	Henri Collé (SUI)	+ 22' 12"

General classification after stage 7

Rank	Rider	Time
1	Ottavio Bottecchia (ITA)	
2	Nicolas Frantz (LUX)	+ 49' 03"
3	Marcel Huot (FRA)	+ 55' 54"
4		
5		
6		
7		
8		
9		
10		

== Stage 8 ==
6 July 1924 — Perpignan to Toulon, 427 km (265 mi)

Stage 8 result

Rank	Rider	Time
1	Louis Mottiat (BEL)	17h 04' 45"
2	Giovanni Brunero (ITA)	+ 2' 25"
3	Ottavio Bottecchia (ITA)	+ 4' 21"
4	Omer Huyse (BEL)	s.t.
5	Ermanno Vallazza (ITA)	+ 4' 29"
6	Nicolas Frantz (LUX)	+ 6' 14"
7	Romain Bellenger (FRA)	s.t.
8	Arsène Alancourt (FRA)	s.t.
9	Philippe Thys (BEL)	s.t.
10	Gaston Degy (FRA)	s.t.

General classification after stage 8

Rank	Rider	Time
1	Ottavio Bottecchia (ITA)	
2	Nicolas Frantz (LUX)	+ 50' 56"
3	Giovanni Brunero (ITA)	+ 58' 32"
4		
5		
6		
7		
8		
9		
10		
