= 1922 Tour de France, Stage 9 to Stage 15 =

Cycling race stages

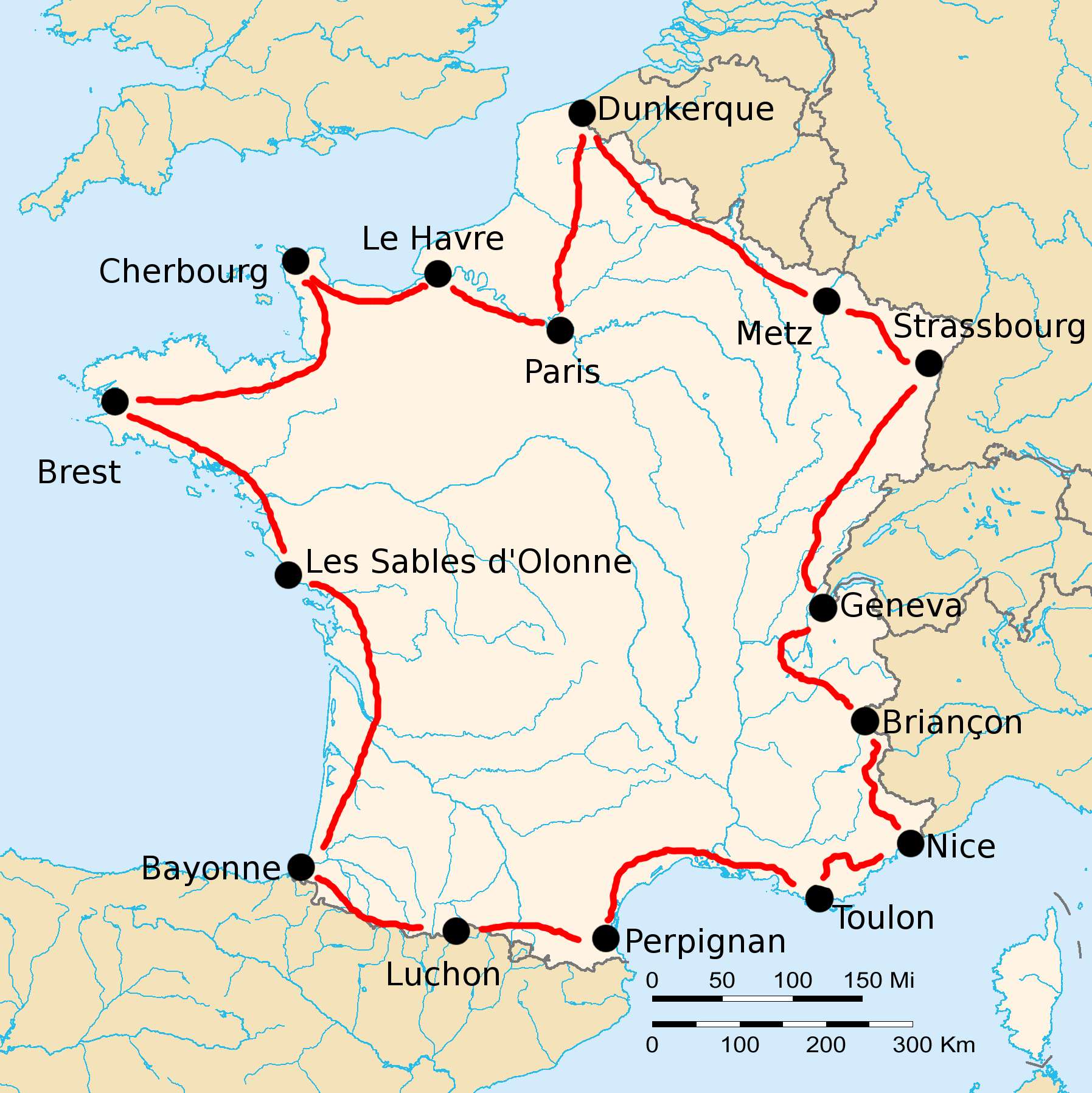
Route of the 1922 Tour de France

The 1922 Tour de France was the 16th edition of Tour de France, one of cycling's Grand Tours. The Tour began in Paris with a flat stage on 25 June, and Stage 9 occurred on 11 July with a mountainous stage from Toulon. The race finished in Paris on 23 July.

== Stage 9 ==
11 July 1922 — Toulon to Nice, 284 km (176 mi)

Stage 9 result

Rank	Rider	Time
1	Philippe Thys (BEL)	11h 40' 12"
2	Jean Alavoine (FRA)	s.t.
3	Émile Masson (BEL)	+ 4' 42"
4	Firmin Lambot (BEL)	s.t.
5	Jules Nempon (FRA)	+ 4' 55"
6	Arsène Alancourt (FRA)	+ 8' 42"
7	Victor Lenaers (BEL)	+ 9' 22"
8	Giuseppe Santhià (ITA)	+ 11' 23"
9	Félix Sellier (BEL)	+ 20' 48"
10	Joseph Marchand (BEL)	s.t.

General classification after stage 9

Rank	Rider	Time
1	Jean Alavoine (FRA)	
2	Firmin Lambot (BEL)	+ 19' 01"
3	Victor Lenaers (BEL)	+ 36' 43"
4		
5		
6		
7		
8		
9		
10		

== Stage 10 ==
13 July 1922 — Nice to Briançon, 274 km (170 mi)

Stage 10 result

Rank	Rider	Time
1	Philippe Thys (BEL)	12h 50' 07"
2	Félix Sellier (BEL)	s.t.
3	Hector Heusghem (BEL)	+ 15"
4	Jean Alavoine (FRA)	+ 32"
5	Théophile Beeckman (BEL)	s.t.
6	Victor Lenaers (BEL)	+ 3' 23"
7	Firmin Lambot (BEL)	+ 3' 49"
8	Eugène Christophe (FRA)	+ 5' 22"
9	Arsène Alancourt (FRA)	+ 15' 45"
10	Émile Masson (BEL)	+ 19' 51"

General classification after stage 10

Rank	Rider	Time
1	Jean Alavoine (FRA)	
2	Firmin Lambot (BEL)	+ 22' 18"
3	Victor Lenaers (BEL)	+ 39' 34"
4		
5		
6		
7		
8		
9		
10		

== Stage 11 ==
15 July 1922 — Briançon to Geneva, 260 km (160 mi)

Stage 11 result

Rank	Rider	Time
1	Émile Masson (BEL)	10h 49' 14"
2	Hector Tiberghien (BEL)	s.t.
3	Hector Heusghem (BEL)	+ 4' 47"
4	Félix Sellier (BEL)	+ 12' 45"
5	Firmin Lambot (BEL)	+ 22' 36"
6	Federico Gay (ITA)	+ 26' 13"
7	José Pelletier (FRA)	+ 32' 22"
8	Théophile Beeckman (BEL)	s.t.
9	Jules Nempon (FRA)	+ 33' 19"
10	Gaston Degy (FRA)	+ 34' 32"

General classification after stage 11

Rank	Rider	Time
1	Jean Alavoine (FRA)	
2	Firmin Lambot (BEL)	+ 6' 53"
3	Hector Heusghem (BEL)	+ 15' 49"
4		
5		
6		
7		
8		
9		
10		

== Stage 12 ==
17 July 1922 — Geneva to Strasbourg, 371 km (231 mi)

Stage 12 result

Rank	Rider	Time
1	Émile Masson (BEL)	15h 15' 43"
2	Joseph Muller (FRA)	s.t.
3	Jean Rossius (BEL)	+ 10' 46"
4	Hector Heusghem (BEL)	s.t.
5	Léon Despontin (BEL)	+ 11' 17"
6	Félix Sellier (BEL)	+ 19' 10"
7	Federico Gay (ITA)	s.t.
8	Arsène Alancourt (FRA)	+ 22' 55"
9	Hector Tiberghien (BEL)	s.t.
10	Gaston Degy (FRA)	s.t.

General classification after stage 12

Rank	Rider	Time
1	Hector Heusghem (BEL)	
2	Firmin Lambot (BEL)	+ 3' 13"
3	Jean Alavoine (FRA)	+ 10' 24"
4		
5		
6		
7		
8		
9		
10		

== Stage 13 ==
19 July 1922 — Strasbourg to Metz, 300 km (190 mi)

Stage 13 result

Rank	Rider	Time
1	Federico Gay (ITA)	12h 02' 34"
2	Jean Rossius (BEL)	s.t.
3	Philippe Thys (BEL)	s.t.
4	Hector Tiberghien (BEL)	s.t.
5	José Pelletier (FRA)	s.t.
6	Louis Heusghem (BEL)	s.t.
7	Émile Masson (BEL)	s.t.
8	Félix Sellier (BEL)	s.t.
9	Victor Lenaers (BEL)	s.t.
10	Léon Despontin (BEL)	s.t.

General classification after stage 13

Rank	Rider	Time
1	Firmin Lambot (BEL)	
2	Jean Alavoine (FRA)	+ 33' 16"
3	Victor Lenaers (BEL)	+ 47' 10"
4		
5		
6		
7		
8		
9		
10		

== Stage 14 ==
21 July 1922 — Metz to Dunkerque, 433 km (269 mi)

Stage 14 result

Rank	Rider	Time
1	Félix Sellier (BEL)	17h 07' 09"
2	Hector Tiberghien (BEL)	s.t.
3	Hector Heusghem (BEL)	s.t.
4	Jean Rossius (BEL)	+ 6' 28"
5	Victor Lenaers (BEL)	s.t.
6	Firmin Lambot (BEL)	s.t.
7	Eugène Christophe (FRA)	s.t.
8	Théophile Beeckman (BEL)	s.t.
9	Jean Alavoine (FRA)	+ 16' 05"
10	Giuseppe Santhià (ITA)	s.t.

General classification after stage 14

Rank	Rider	Time
1	Firmin Lambot (BEL)	
2	Jean Alavoine (FRA)	+ 42' 53"
3	Félix Sellier (BEL)	+ 43' 40"
4		
5		
6		
7		
8		
9		
10		

== Stage 15 ==
23 July 1922 — Dunkerque to Paris, 340 km (210 mi)

Stage 15 result

Rank	Rider	Time
1	Philippe Thys (BEL)	14h 36' 57"
2	Jean Rossius (BEL)	s.t.
3	Félix Sellier (BEL)	s.t.
4	Hector Tiberghien (BEL)	s.t.
5	Arsène Alancourt (FRA)	s.t.
6	Gaston Degy (FRA)	s.t.
7	Émile Masson (BEL)	s.t.
8	Victor Lenaers (BEL)	s.t.
9	Jean Alavoine (FRA)	s.t.
10	Eugène Christophe (FRA)	s.t.

General classification after stage 15

Rank	Rider	Time
1	Firmin Lambot (BEL)	222h 08' 06"
2	Jean Alavoine (FRA)	+ 41' 15"
3	Félix Sellier (BEL)	+ 42' 02"
4	Hector Heusghem (BEL)	+ 43' 56"
5	Victor Lenaers (BEL)	+ 45' 32"
6	Hector Tiberghien (BEL)	+ 1h 21' 35"
7	Léon Despontin (BEL)	+ 2h 24' 29"
8	Eugène Christophe (FRA)	+ 3h 25' 39"
9	Jean Rossius (BEL)	+ 3h 26' 06"
10	Gaston Degy (FRA)	+ 3h 49' 13"
