= 1922 Tour de France, Stage 1 to Stage 8 =

Cycling race stages

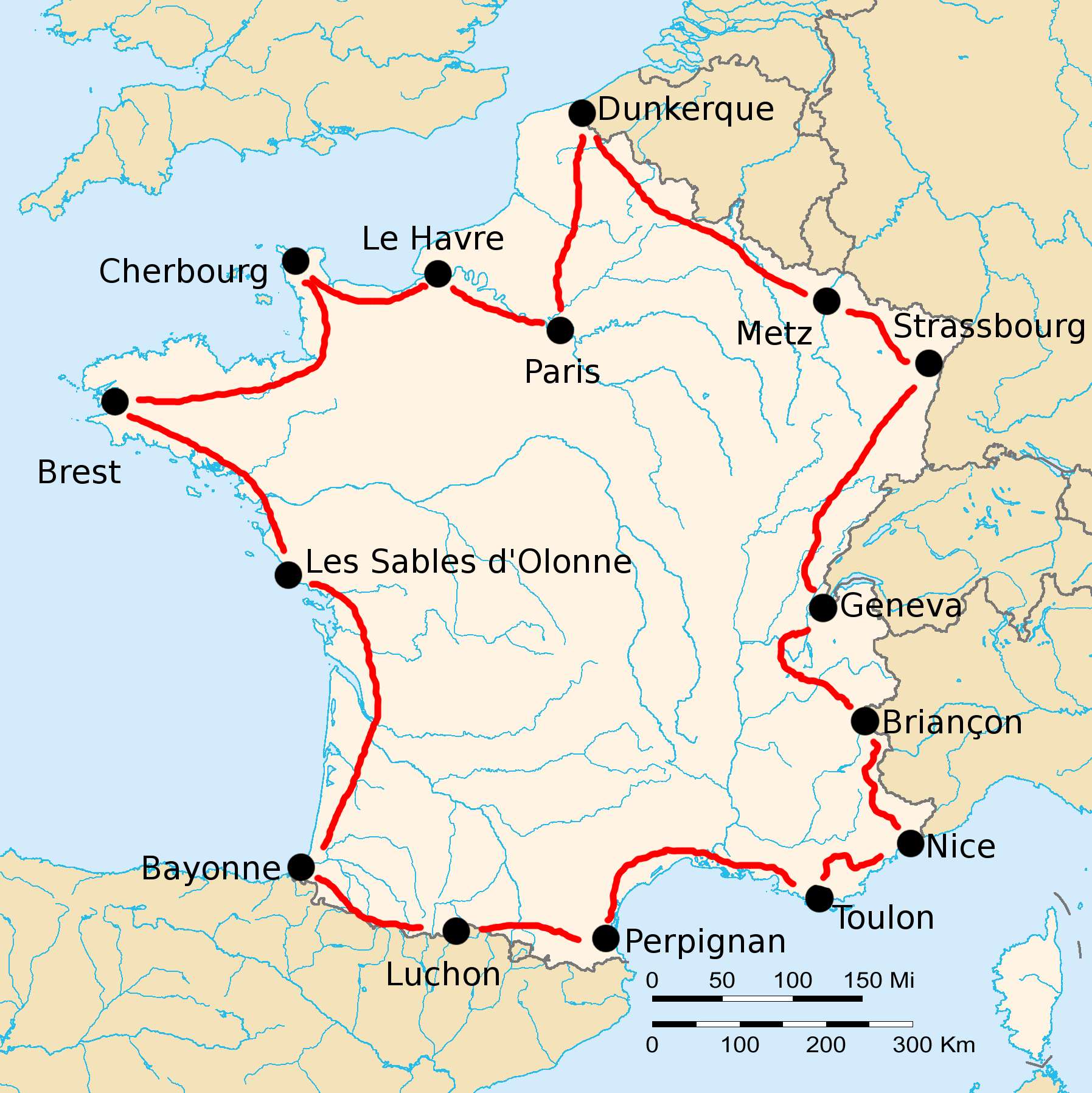
Route of the 1922 Tour de France

The 1922 Tour de France was the 16th edition of Tour de France, one of cycling's Grand Tours. The Tour began in Paris with a flat stage on 25 June, and Stage 8 occurred on 9 July with a flat stage to Toulon. The race finished in Paris on 23 July.

== Stage 1 ==
25 June 1922 — Paris to Le Havre, 388 km (241 mi)

Stage 1 result and general classification after stage 1

Rank	Rider	Time
1	Robert Jacquinot (FRA)	15h 11' 48"
2	Eugène Christophe (FRA)	+ 8' 19"
3	Jean Rossius (BEL)	+ 14' 49"
4	Félix Sellier (BEL)	s.t.
5	Hector Tiberghien (BEL)	s.t.
6	Léon Scieur (BEL)	s.t.
7	Romain Bellenger (FRA)	+ 20' 17"
8	Philippe Thys (BEL)	+ 27' 03"
9	Léon Despontin (BEL)	+ 29' 38"
10	Gaston Degy (FRA)	+ 34' 07"

== Stage 2 ==
27 June 1922 — Le Havre to Cherbourg, 364 km (226 mi)

Stage 2 result

Rank	Rider	Time
1	Romain Bellenger (FRA)	15h 07' 53"
2	Philippe Thys (BEL)	s.t.
3	Robert Jacquinot (FRA)	s.t.
4	Victor Lenaers (BEL)	s.t.
5	Jean Alavoine (FRA)	s.t.
6	Émile Masson (BEL)	s.t.
7	Félix Sellier (BEL)	+ 47"
8	Jules Matton (BEL)	s.t.
9	Hector Heusghem (BEL)	s.t.
10	Léon Despontin (BEL)	s.t.

General classification after stage 2

Rank	Rider	Time
1	Robert Jacquinot (FRA)	
2	Eugène Christophe (FRA)	+ 9' 06"
3	Hector Tiberghien (BEL)	+ 15' 36"
4		
5		
6		
7		
8		
9		
10		

== Stage 3 ==
29 June 1922 — Cherbourg to Brest, 405 km (252 mi)

Stage 3 result

Rank	Rider	Time
1	Robert Jacquinot (FRA)	17h 34' 44"
2	Honoré Barthélémy (FRA)	s.t.
3	Romain Bellenger (FRA)	s.t.
4	Hector Heusghem (BEL)	s.t.
5	Federico Gay (ITA)	s.t.
6	Eugène Christophe (FRA)	s.t.
7	Gaston Degy (FRA)	s.t.
8	Jean Rossius (BEL)	s.t.
9	Victor Lenaers (BEL)	s.t.
10	Firmin Lambot (BEL)	s.t.

General classification after stage 3

Rank	Rider	Time
1	Robert Jacquinot (FRA)	
2	Eugène Christophe (FRA)	+ 9' 06"
3	Hector Tiberghien (BEL)	+ 15' 36"
4		
5		
6		
7		
8		
9		
10		

== Stage 4 ==
1 July 1922 — Brest to Les Sables-d'Olonne, 412 km (256 mi)

Stage 4 result

Rank	Rider	Time
1	Philippe Thys (BEL)	15h 16' 24"
2	Federico Gay (ITA)	s.t.
3	Hector Heusghem (BEL)	s.t.
4	Eugène Christophe (FRA)	s.t.
5	Eugène Dhers (FRA)	s.t.
6	Arsène Alancourt (FRA)	s.t.
7	Firmin Lambot (BEL)	+ 13' 18"
8	Jean Alavoine (FRA)	+ 24' 49"
9	Victor Lenaers (BEL)	s.t.
10	Félix Sellier (BEL)	s.t.

General classification after stage 4

Rank	Rider	Time
1	Eugène Christophe (FRA)	
2	Philippe Thys (BEL)	+ 17' 55"
3	Félix Sellier (BEL)	+ 34' 42"
4		
5		
6		
7		
8		
9		
10		

== Stage 5 ==
3 July 1922 — Les Sables-d'Olonne to Bayonne, 482 km (300 mi)

Stage 5 result

Rank	Rider	Time
1	Jean Alavoine (FRA)	19h 27' 45"
2	Victor Lenaers (BEL)	s.t.
3	Hector Heusghem (BEL)	s.t.
4	Philippe Thys (BEL)	s.t.
5	Firmin Lambot (BEL)	s.t.
6	Eugène Dhers (FRA)	s.t.
7	Hector Tiberghien (BEL)	+ 57"
8	Jean Rossius (BEL)	+ 3' 25"
9	Émile Masson (BEL)	s.t.
10	Giuseppe Santhià (ITA)	+ 9' 18"

General classification after stage 5

Rank	Rider	Time
1	Eugène Christophe (FRA)	
2	Philippe Thys (BEL)	+ 8' 15"
3	Félix Sellier (BEL)	+ 34' 49"
4		
5		
6		
7		
8		
9		
10		

== Stage 6 ==
5 July 1922 — Bayonne to Luchon, 326 km (203 mi)

Stage 6 result

Rank	Rider	Time
1	Jean Alavoine (FRA)	14h 28' 44"
2	Victor Lenaers (BEL)	+ 16' 43"
3	Firmin Lambot (BEL)	+ 31' 05"
4	Eugène Christophe (FRA)	+ 38' 39"
5	Hector Heusghem (BEL)	+ 44' 18"
6	Léon Despontin (BEL)	+ 48' 21"
7	Joseph Marchand (BEL)	+ 48' 53"
8	Federico Gay (ITA)	+ 54' 44"
9	Honoré Barthélémy (FRA)	+ 1h 05' 05"
10	Hector Tiberghien (BEL)	s.t.

General classification after stage 6

Rank	Rider	Time
1	Eugène Christophe (FRA)	
2	Jean Alavoine (FRA)	+ 27' 12"
3	Victor Lenaers (BEL)	+ 38' 36"
4		
5		
6		
7		
8		
9		
10		

== Stage 7 ==
7 July 1922 — Luchon to Perpignan, 323 km (201 mi)

Stage 7 result

Rank	Rider	Time
1	Jean Alavoine (FRA)	12h 05' 43"
2	Hector Tiberghien (BEL)	s.t.
3	Firmin Lambot (BEL)	s.t.
4	Émile Masson (BEL)	s.t.
5	Hector Heusghem (BEL)	+ 2' 14"
6	Félix Sellier (BEL)	s.t.
7	Philippe Thys (BEL)	+ 2' 46"
8	Léon Despontin (BEL)	+ 4' 12"
9	Joseph Muller (FRA)	+ 15' 46"
10	Victor Lenaers (BEL)	+ 15' 57"

General classification after stage 7

Rank	Rider	Time
1	Jean Alavoine (FRA)	
2	Firmin Lambot (BEL)	+ 14' 19"
3	Eugène Christophe (FRA)	+ 19' 34"
4		
5		
6		
7		
8		
9		
10		

== Stage 8 ==
9 July 1922 — Perpignan to Toulon, 411 km (255 mi)

Stage 8 result

Rank	Rider	Time
1	Philippe Thys (BEL)	15h 47' 18"
2	Félix Sellier (BEL)	s.t.
3	Victor Lenaers (BEL)	s.t.
4	Jean Alavoine (FRA)	s.t.
5	Émile Masson (BEL)	s.t.
6	Firmin Lambot (BEL)	s.t.
7	Eugène Christophe (FRA)	s.t.
8	Léon Despontin (BEL)	s.t.
9	Hector Tiberghien (BEL)	s.t.
10	José Pelletier (FRA)	+ 23"

General classification after stage 8

Rank	Rider	Time
1	Jean Alavoine (FRA)	
2	Firmin Lambot (BEL)	+ 14' 19"
3	Eugène Christophe (FRA)	+ 19' 34"
4		
5		
6		
7		
8		
9		
10		
