= 1924 Tour de France, Stage 9 to Stage 15 =

Cycling race stages

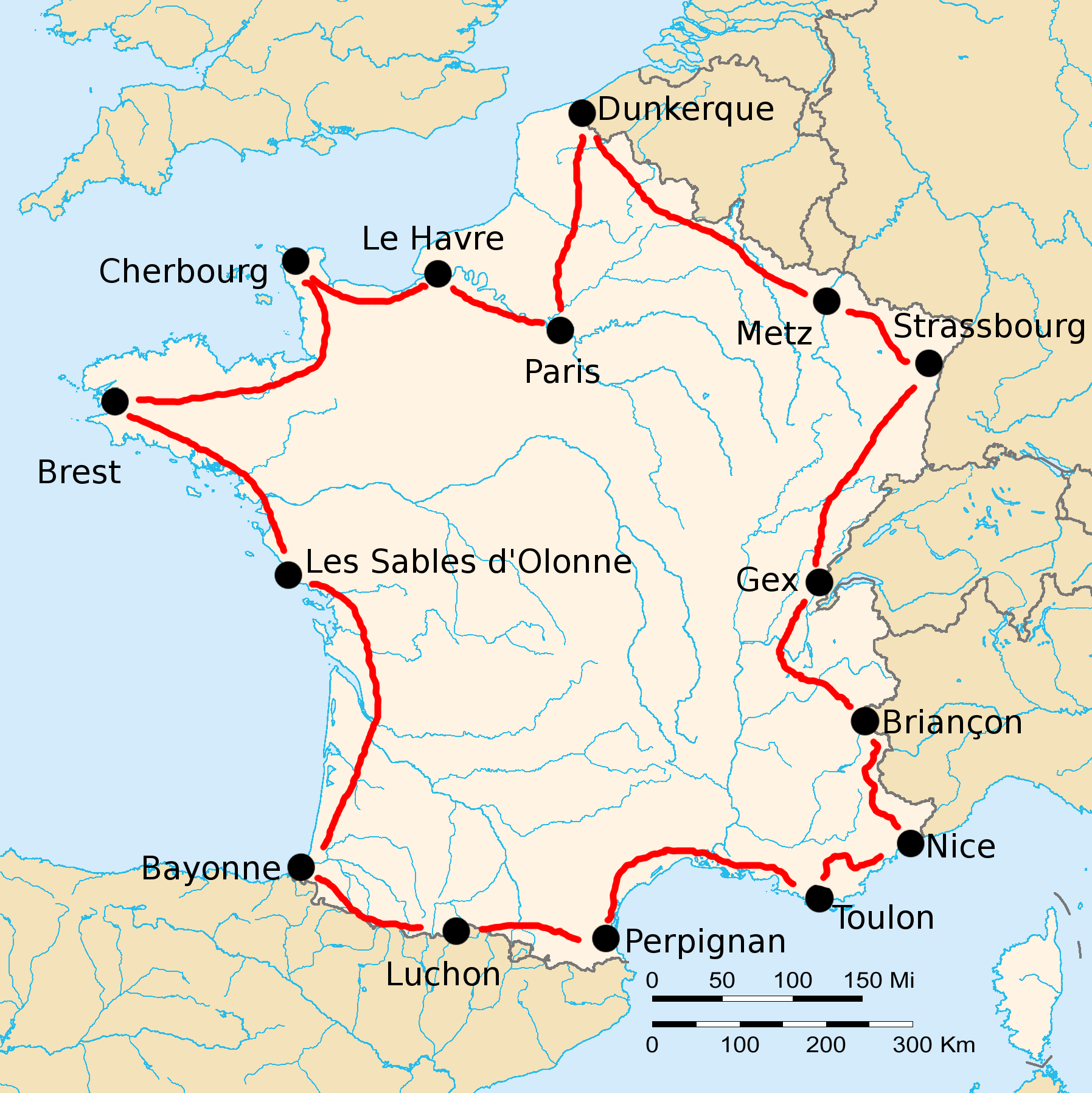
Route of the 1924 Tour de France

The 1924 Tour de France was the 18th edition of Tour de France, one of cycling's Grand Tours. The Tour began in Paris with a flat stage on 22 June, and Stage 9 occurred on 8 July with a mountainous stage from Toulon. The race finished in Paris on 20 July.

== Stage 9 ==
8 July 1924 — Toulon to Nice, 280 km (170 mi)

Stage 9 result

Rank	Rider	Time
1	Philippe Thys (BEL)	11h 52' 08"
2	Bartolomeo Aimo (ITA)	s.t.
3	Jean Alavoine (FRA)	+ 6' 13"
4	Ottavio Bottecchia (ITA)	s.t.
5	Giovanni Brunero (ITA)	s.t.
6	Nicolas Frantz (LUX)	s.t.
7	Ermanno Vallazza (ITA)	+ 10' 10"
8	Théophile Beeckman (BEL)	+ 10' 24"
9	Lucien Buysse (BEL)	+ 10' 58"
10	Georges Cuvelier (FRA)	+ 13' 04"

General classification after stage 9

Rank	Rider	Time
1	Ottavio Bottecchia (ITA)	
2	Nicolas Frantz (LUX)	+ 50' 56"
3	Giovanni Brunero (ITA)	+ 58' 32"
4		
5		
6		
7		
8		
9		
10		

== Stage 10 ==
10 July 1924 — Nice to Briançon, 275 km (171 mi)

Stage 10 result

Rank	Rider	Time
1	Giovanni Brunero (ITA)	12h 51' 07"
2	Nicolas Frantz (LUX)	+ 51"
3	Romain Bellenger (FRA)	+ 8' 30"
4	Ottavio Bottecchia (ITA)	+ 9' 55"
5	Bartolomeo Aimo (ITA)	+ 11' 24"
6	Arsène Alancourt (FRA)	+ 17' 12"
7	Joseph Muller (FRA)	+ 19' 55"
8	Lucien Buysse (BEL)	+ 25' 26"
9	Ermanno Vallazza (ITA)	+ 32' 09"
10	Philippe Thys (BEL)	+ 34' 38"

General classification after stage 10

Rank	Rider	Time
1	Ottavio Bottecchia (ITA)	
2	Nicolas Frantz (LUX)	+ 41' 52"
3	Giovanni Brunero (ITA)	+ 45' 37"
4		
5		
6		
7		
8		
9		
10		

== Stage 11 ==
12 July 1924 — Briançon to Gex, 307 km (191 mi)

Stage 11 result

Rank	Rider	Time
1	Nicolas Frantz (LUX)	12h 03' 51"
2	Jean Alavoine (FRA)	s.t.
3	Félix Goethals (FRA)	s.t.
4	Théophile Beeckman (BEL)	s.t.
5	Ottavio Bottecchia (ITA)	s.t.
6	Bartolomeo Aimo (ITA)	s.t.
7	Lucien Buysse (BEL)	s.t.
8	Romain Bellenger (FRA)	s.t.
9	Raymond Englebert (BEL)	s.t.
10	Hector Tiberghien (BEL)	s.t.

General classification after stage 11

Rank	Rider	Time
1	Ottavio Bottecchia (ITA)	
2	Nicolas Frantz (LUX)	+ 38' 52"
3	Giovanni Brunero (ITA)	+ 45' 37"
4		
5		
6		
7		
8		
9		
10		

== Stage 12 ==
14 July 1924 — Gex to Strasbourg, 360 km (220 mi)

Stage 12 result

Rank	Rider	Time
1	Nicolas Frantz (LUX)	15h 51' 02"
2	Georges Cuvelier (FRA)	s.t.
3	Raymond Englebert (BEL)	s.t.
4	Ottavio Bottecchia (ITA)	s.t.
5	Philippe Thys (BEL)	+ 2' 17"
6	Arsène Alancourt (FRA)	+ 3' 50"
7	Jean Alavoine (FRA)	s.t.
8	Joseph Muller (FRA)	s.t.
9	Théophile Beeckman (BEL)	s.t.
10	Lucien Rich (FRA)	s.t.

General classification after stage 12

Rank	Rider	Time
1	Ottavio Bottecchia (ITA)	
2	Nicolas Frantz (LUX)	+ 35' 52"
3	Giovanni Brunero (ITA)	+ 49' 27"
4		
5		
6		
7		
8		
9		
10		

== Stage 13 ==
16 July 1924 — Strasbourg to Metz, 300 km (190 mi)

Stage 13 result

Rank	Rider	Time
1	Arsène Alancourt (FRA)	11h 36' 27"
2	Georges Cuvelier (FRA)	+ 2' 38"
3	Nicolas Frantz (LUX)	+ 3' 09"
4	Félix Goethals (FRA)	s.t.
5	Lucien Buysse (BEL)	s.t.
6	Théophile Beeckman (BEL)	s.t.
7	Gaston Degy (FRA)	s.t.
8	Joseph Muller (FRA)	s.t.
9	Raymond Englebert (BEL)	s.t.
10	Lucien Rich (FRA)	s.t.

General classification after stage 13

Rank	Rider	Time
1	Ottavio Bottecchia (ITA)	
2	Nicolas Frantz (LUX)	+ 32' 26"
3	Giovanni Brunero (ITA)	+ 50' 47"
4		
5		
6		
7		
8		
9		
10		

== Stage 14 ==
18 July 1924 — Metz to Dunkerque, 433 km (269 mi)

Stage 14 result

Rank	Rider	Time
1	Romain Bellenger (FRA)	20h 17' 51"
2	Arsène Alancourt (FRA)	s.t.
3	Lucien Buysse (BEL)	s.t.
4	Joseph Muller (FRA)	s.t.
5	Omer Huyse (BEL)	s.t.
6	Théophile Beeckman (BEL)	+ 44"
7	Bartolomeo Aimo (ITA)	+ 1' 24"
8	Hector Tiberghien (BEL)	+ 4' 02"
9	Nicolas Frantz (LUX)	s.t.
10	Ottavio Bottecchia (ITA)	s.t.

General classification after stage 14

Rank	Rider	Time
1	Ottavio Bottecchia (ITA)	
2	Nicolas Frantz (LUX)	+ 32' 26"
3	Lucien Buysse (BEL)	+ 1h 29' 03"
4		
5		
6		
7		
8		
9		
10		

== Stage 15 ==
20 July 1924 — Dunkerque to Paris, 343 km (213 mi)

Stage 15 result

Rank	Rider	Time
1	Ottavio Bottecchia (ITA)	14h 45' 20"
2	Arsène Alancourt (FRA)	s.t.
3	Jean Alavoine (FRA)	s.t.
4	Nicolas Frantz (LUX)	s.t.
5	Théophile Beeckman (BEL)	s.t.
6	Joseph Muller (FRA)	s.t.
7	Gaston Degy (FRA)	s.t.
8	Lucien Rich (FRA)	s.t.
9	Lucien Buysse (BEL)	s.t.
10	Maurice Arnoult (FRA)	s.t.

General classification after stage 15

Rank	Rider	Time
1	Ottavio Bottecchia (ITA)	226h 18' 21"
2	Nicolas Frantz (LUX)	+ 35' 36"
3	Lucien Buysse (BEL)	+ 1h 32' 13"
4	Bartolomeo Aimo (ITA)	+ 1h 32' 47"
5	Théophile Beeckman (BEL)	+ 2h 11' 12"
6	Joseph Muller (FRA)	+ 2h 35' 33"
7	Arsène Alancourt (FRA)	+ 2h 41' 31"
8	Romain Bellenger (FRA)	+ 2h 51' 09"
9	Omer Huyse (BEL)	+ 2h 58' 13"
10	Hector Tiberghien (BEL)	+ 3h 05' 04"
