= 1921 Tour de France, Stage 1 to Stage 8 =

Cycling race stages

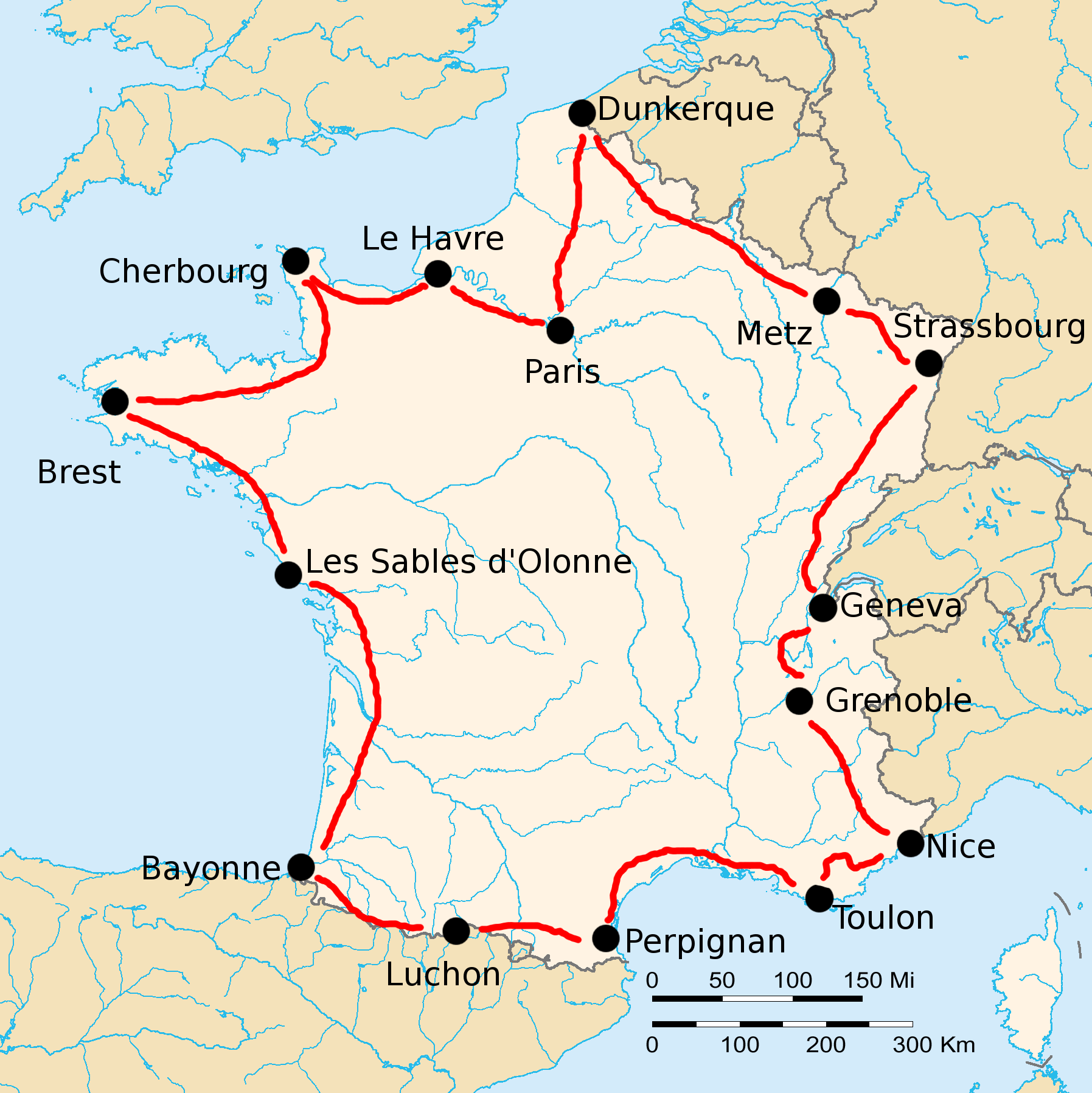
Route of the 1921 Tour de France

The 1921 Tour de France was the 15th edition of Tour de France, one of cycling's Grand Tours. The Tour began in Paris with a flat stage on 26 June, and Stage 8 occurred on 10 July with a flat stage to Toulon. The race finished in Paris on 24 July.

== Stage 1 ==
26 June 1921 — Paris to Le Havre, 388 km (241 mi)

Stage 1 result and general classification after stage 1

Rank	Rider	Time
1	Louis Mottiat (BEL)	15h 28' 10"
2	Honoré Barthélémy (FRA)	+ 2' 37"
3	Léon Scieur (BEL)	+ 6' 37"
4	Albert Dejonghe (BEL)	+ 7' 44"
5	Hector Heusghem (BEL)	+ 10' 03"
6	Marcel Godard (FRA)	+ 19' 10"
7	Eugène Christophe (FRA)	s.t.
8	Joseph Muller (FRA)	+ 20' 53"
9	Félix Sellier (BEL)	+ 28' 55"
10	Luigi Lucotti (ITA)	+ 34' 13"

== Stage 2 ==
28 June 1921 — Le Havre to Cherbourg-en-Cotentin, 364 km (226 mi)

Stage 2 result

Rank	Rider	Time
1	Romain Bellenger (FRA)	13h 07' 50"
2	Léon Scieur (BEL)	+ 3' 14"
3	Hector Heusghem (BEL)	s.t.
4	Robert Gerbaud (FRA)	+ 4' 53"
5	Félix Sellier (BEL)	+ 11' 44"
6	Jean Alavoine (FRA)	+ 20' 42"
7	Eugène Dhers (FRA)	+ 22' 12"
8	Albert Dejonghe (BEL)	+ 28' 10"
9	Luigi Lucotti (ITA)	+ 31' 48"
10	Gaston Degy (FRA)	+ 31' 52"

General classification after stage 2

Rank	Rider	Time
1	Léon Scieur (BEL)	
2	Hector Heusghem (BEL)	+ 3' 26"
3	Albert Dejonghe (BEL)	+ 26' 00"
4		
5		
6		
7		
8		
9		
10		

== Stage 3 ==
30 June 1921 — Cherbourg-en-Cotentin to Brest, 405 km (252 mi)

Stage 3 result

Rank	Rider	Time
1	Léon Scieur (BEL)	15h 08' 45"
2	Honoré Barthélémy (FRA)	+ 9' 12"
3	Romain Bellenger (FRA)	s.t.
4	Hector Heusghem (BEL)	s.t.
5	Jacques Coomans (BEL)	s.t.
6	Eugène Christophe (FRA)	s.t.
7	René Chassot (FRA)	s.t.
8	Albert Dejonghe (BEL)	s.t.
9	Jean Belvaux (BEL)	+ 10' 31"
10	Hector Tiberghien (BEL)	+ 13' 44"

General classification after stage 3

Rank	Rider	Time
1	Léon Scieur (BEL)	
2	Hector Heusghem (BEL)	+ 12' 38"
3	Albert Dejonghe (BEL)	+ 35' 12"
4		
5		
6		
7		
8		
9		
10		

== Stage 4 ==
2 July 1921 — Brest to Les Sables-d'Olonne, 412 km (256 mi)

Stage 4 result

Rank	Rider	Time
1	Louis Mottiat (BEL)	15h 31' 41"
2	Firmin Lambot (BEL)	+ 1"
3	Eugène Dhers (FRA)	s.t.
4	Félix Goethals (FRA)	+ 7' 35"
5	Romain Bellenger (FRA)	s.t.
6	Luigi Lucotti (ITA)	s.t.
7	Honoré Barthélémy (FRA)	s.t.
8	Léon Scieur (BEL)	s.t.
9	Hector Tiberghien (BEL)	s.t.
10	Benjamin Javaux (BEL)	s.t.

General classification after stage 4

Rank	Rider	Time
1	Léon Scieur (BEL)	
2	Hector Heusghem (BEL)	+ 18' 44"
3	Albert Dejonghe (BEL)	+ 37' 21"
4		
5		
6		
7		
8		
9		
10		

== Stage 5 ==
4 July 1921 — Les Sables-d'Olonne to Bayonne, 482 km (300 mi)

Stage 5 result

Rank	Rider	Time
1	Louis Mottiat (BEL)	18h 47' 26"
2	Léon Scieur (BEL)	+ 1"
3	Félix Sellier (BEL)	+ 2"
4	Eugène Christophe (FRA)	+ 2' 12"
5	Léon Despontin (BEL)	s.t.
6	Firmin Lambot (BEL)	+ 3' 03"
7	Hector Tiberghien (BEL)	s.t.
8	Romain Bellenger (FRA)	+ 3' 50"
9	Enrico Sala (ITA)	+ 3' 54"
10	Guillaume Cecherelli (FRA)	+ 3' 59"

General classification after stage 5

Rank	Rider	Time
1	Léon Scieur (BEL)	
2	Hector Heusghem (BEL)	+ 29' 23"
3	Albert Dejonghe (BEL)	+ 48' 17"
4		
5		
6		
7		
8		
9		
10		

== Stage 6 ==
6 July 1921 — Bayonne to Luchon, 326 km (203 mi)

Stage 6 result

Rank	Rider	Time
1	Hector Heusghem (BEL)	15h 09' 36"
2	Albert Dejonghe (BEL)	+ 24' 02"
3	Léon Scieur (BEL)	+ 25' 17"
4	Honoré Barthélémy (FRA)	+ 32' 53"
5	Luigi Lucotti (ITA)	s.t.
6	Firmin Lambot (BEL)	+ 42' 39"
7	Victor Leenaerts (BEL)	+ 45' 56"
8	Romain Bellenger (FRA)	+ 1h 04' 44"
9	Hector Tiberghien (BEL)	s.t.
10	Léon Despontin (BEL)	s.t.

General classification after stage 6

Rank	Rider	Time
1	Léon Scieur (BEL)	
2	Hector Heusghem (BEL)	+ 4' 06"
3	Albert Dejonghe (BEL)	+ 50' 04"
4		
5		
6		
7		
8		
9		
10		

== Stage 7 ==
8 July 1921 — Luchon to Perpignan, 323 km (201 mi)

Stage 7 result

Rank	Rider	Time
1	Louis Mottiat (BEL)	12h 58' 15"
2	Honoré Barthélémy (FRA)	s.t.
3	Hector Heusghem (BEL)	s.t.
4	Hector Tiberghien (BEL)	s.t.
5	Léon Scieur (BEL)	s.t.
6	Albert Dejonghe (BEL)	s.t.
7	Firmin Lambot (BEL)	s.t.
8	Victor Leenaerts (BEL)	+ 1' 02"
9	Léon Despontin (BEL)	s.t.
10	Luigi Lucotti (ITA)	+ 3' 01"

General classification after stage 7

Rank	Rider	Time
1	Léon Scieur (BEL)	
2	Hector Heusghem (BEL)	+ 4' 06"
3	Albert Dejonghe (BEL)	+ 50' 04"
4		
5		
6		
7		
8		
9		
10		

== Stage 8 ==
10 July 1921 — Perpignan to Toulon, 411 km (255 mi)

Stage 8 result

Rank	Rider	Time
1	Luigi Lucotti (ITA)	16h 06' 51"
2	Firmin Lambot (BEL)	+ 1"
3	Louis Mottiat (BEL)	+ 1' 11"
4	Léon Scieur (BEL)	+ 1' 17"
5	Félix Goethals (FRA)	+ 2' 02"
6	Hector Heusghem (BEL)	+ 2' 17"
7	Félix Sellier (BEL)	s.t.
8	Hector Tiberghien (BEL)	+ 5' 16"
9	Léon Despontin (BEL)	s.t.
10	Noël Amenc (FRA)	+ 10' 06"

General classification after stage 8

Rank	Rider	Time
1	Léon Scieur (BEL)	
2	Hector Heusghem (BEL)	+ 4' 06"
3	Albert Dejonghe (BEL)	+ 1h 18' 15"
4		
5		
6		
7		
8		
9		
10		
