= 1924 Tour de France =

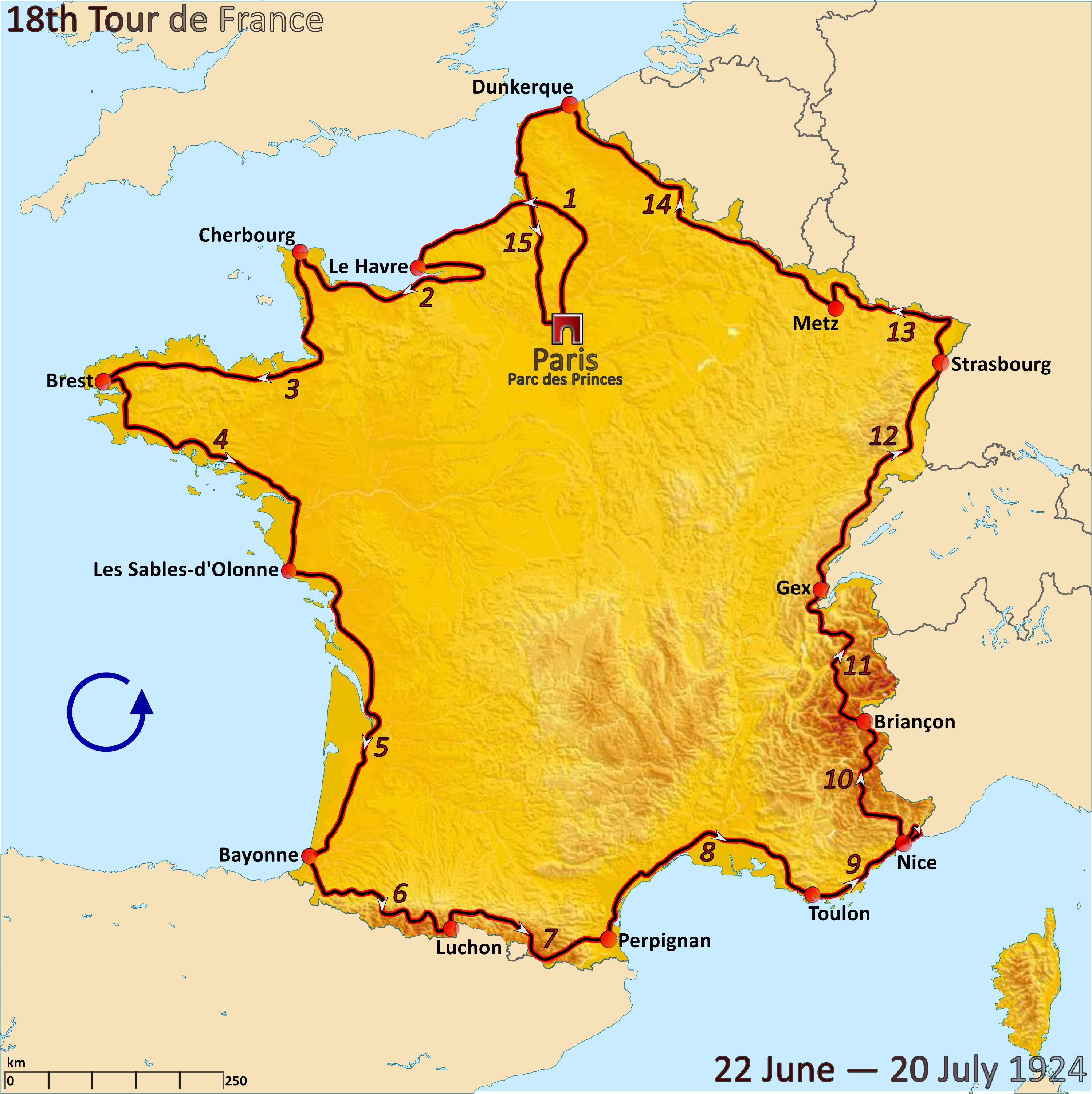
- Route of the 1924 Tour de France followed counterclockwise, starting in Paris

Race details
- Dates: 22 June – 20 July 1924
- Stages: 15
- Distance: 5,425 km (3,371 mi)
- Winning time: 222h 18' 21"

Results
Jersey awarded to the overall winner	Winner	Ottavio Bottecchia (ITA)	(1st class)
	Second	Nicolas Frantz (LUX)	(1st class)
	Third	Lucien Buysse (BEL)	(1st class)

The 1924 Tour de France was the 18th edition of the Tour de France and was won by Ottavio Bottecchia. He was the first Italian cyclist to win the Tour and the first rider to hold the yellow jersey the entire event. The race was held over 5,425 km with an average speed of 23.972 km/h (14.896 mph). 60 riders finished the race from the original 157 cyclists.

Entrants of the 1924 Tour included several past and future winners including defending champion Henri Pélissier (1923), Philippe Thys (1913, 1914, 1920), Lucien Buysse (1926) and Nicolas Frantz (1927, 1928).

The event saw the increase of the time bonus for stage wins move from 2 minutes to 3 minutes. In addition, it was the final year of the 15-stage format that had started in 1910. One of the most important events of the race occurred on the third stage, when defending champion Pélissier quit the race because of a new fight with tour organiser Henri Desgrange.

== Innovations and changes ==
In 1923, a time bonus of two minutes for each stage winner had been introduced. This was considered successful, and the time bonus was increased to three minutes for the 1924 Tour de France.

After the 1923 Tour de France, the winner Henri Pélissier had said that the runner-up Bottecchia would go on to win the race.

== Race overview ==
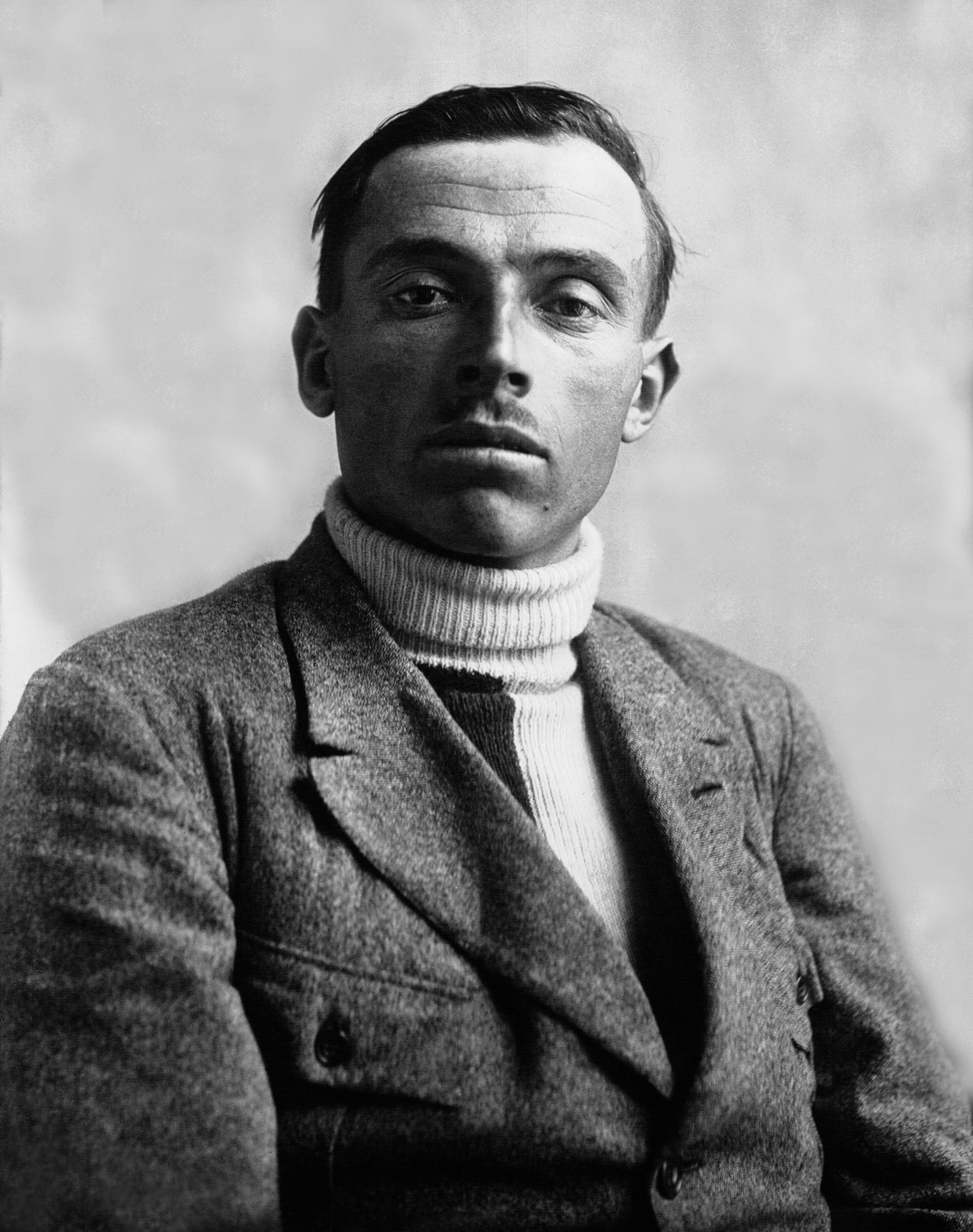
Ottavio Bottecchia, winner of the 1924 Tour de France

In 1924, there was a rule that the cyclists had to finish with everything they started with, and the officials suspected that Pélissier would start in the cold morning with many jerseys, and remove them once the day warmed up. The rule had been introduced in 1920, when all the cyclists were sponsored by the combined sponsor La Sportive, to prevent waste of material. Pélissier objected to the rule, on the ground that the jerseys that he wore were his own, and had not been provided by the sponsor.

At the start of the third stage, a tour official checked how many jerseys Henri Pélissier was wearing. Pélissier was angry, and declared that he would not start the race. He did so anyway, but retired at Coutances, together with his brother Francis Pélissier and teammate Maurice Ville. The three cyclists met journalist Albert Londres of Petit Parisien, to whom they complained about the circumstances in which the cyclists had to race. In that third stage, that ended on a circuit, Theophile Beeckman crossed the finish line first. However, the bell indicating the last lap was not rung, and Philippe Thys was placed ex aequo on the first place by the officials.

In the first five stages, the cyclists finished in groups, and the time bonus of three minutes for the winner was the only thing that separated the cyclists. After the third and fourth stage, Bottecchia had the same time as Beeckman, although Bottecchia was still given the yellow jersey as classification leader. In the sixth and seventh stage, Bottecchia extended his lead in the Pyrenees. After these stages, he had a margin of 50 minutes over second-placed Nicolas Frantz.

In the Alps, Bottecchia was not so dominant anymore. In stages 10 to 13, Frantz won back a few minutes per stage, but it was not enough. In the thirteenth stage, Bottecchia ran into a dog and fell. Nicolas Frantz tried to win back time, but failed.

In the penultimate stage, Italian Giovanni Brunero was in third place in the overall classification, when he had to give up. Prior to the last stage, the margin between Bottecchia and Frantz was still 32 minutes. Bottecchia won the final stage to Paris, and the time bonus of 3 minutes made the margin 35 minutes.

== Results ==
In each stage, all cyclists started together. The cyclist who reached the finish first, was the winner of the stage. The time that each cyclist required to finish the stage was recorded. For the general classification, these times were added up; the cyclist with the least accumulated time (after compensating for time bonuses and/or time penalties) was the race leader, identified by the yellow jersey.

=== Stage winners ===
Stage characteristics and winners
Stage	Date	Course	Distance	Type (Note: There was no distinction in the rules between plain stages and mountain stages; the icons shown here indicate which stages included mountains.)	Winner	Race leader
1	22 June	Paris to Le Havre	381 km (237 mi)	Plain stage	Ottavio Bottecchia (ITA)	Ottavio Bottecchia (ITA)
2	24 June	Le Havre to Cherbourg-en-Cotentin	371 km (231 mi)	Plain stage	Romain Bellenger (FRA)	Ottavio Bottecchia (ITA)
3	26 June	Cherbourg to Brest	405 km (252 mi)	Plain stage	Philippe Thys (BEL); Théophile Beeckman (BEL)	Ottavio Bottecchia (ITA)
4	28 June	Brest to Les Sables-d'Olonne	412 km (256 mi)	Plain stage	Félix Goethals (FRA)	Ottavio Bottecchia (ITA)
5	30 June	Les Sables-d'Olonne to Bayonne	482 km (300 mi)	Plain stage	Omer Huyse (BEL)	Ottavio Bottecchia (ITA)
6	2 July	Bayonne to Luchon	326 km (203 mi)	Stage with mountain(s)	Ottavio Bottecchia (ITA)	Ottavio Bottecchia (ITA)
7	4 July	Luchon to Perpignan	323 km (201 mi)	Stage with mountain(s)	Ottavio Bottecchia (ITA)	Ottavio Bottecchia (ITA)
8	6 July	Perpignan to Toulon	427 km (265 mi)	Plain stage	Louis Mottiat (BEL)	Ottavio Bottecchia (ITA)
9	8 July	Toulon to Nice	280 km (170 mi)	Stage with mountain(s)	Philippe Thys (BEL)	Ottavio Bottecchia (ITA)
10	10 July	Nice to Briançon	275 km (171 mi)	Stage with mountain(s)	Giovanni Brunero (ITA)	Ottavio Bottecchia (ITA)
11	12 July	Briançon to Gex	307 km (191 mi)	Stage with mountain(s)	Nicolas Frantz (LUX)	Ottavio Bottecchia (ITA)
12	14 July	Gex to Strasbourg	360 km (220 mi)	Stage with mountain(s)	Nicolas Frantz (LUX)	Ottavio Bottecchia (ITA)
13	16 July	Strasbourg to Metz	300 km (190 mi)	Plain stage	Arsène Alancourt (FRA)	Ottavio Bottecchia (ITA)
14	18 July	Metz to Dunkerque	433 km (269 mi)	Plain stage	Romain Bellenger (FRA)	Ottavio Bottecchia (ITA)
15	20 July	Dunkerque to Paris	343 km (213 mi)	Plain stage	Ottavio Bottecchia (ITA)	Ottavio Bottecchia (ITA)
	Total		5,425 km (3,371 mi)			

=== General classification ===
Bottecchia became the first Italian cyclist who won the Tour de France, and the first cyclist to wear the yellow jersey from the start to the end of the Tour de France.

Final general classification (1–10)
Rank	Rider	Category	Time
1	Ottavio Bottecchia (ITA)	1	226h 18' 21"
2	Nicolas Frantz (LUX)	1	+ 35' 36"
3	Lucien Buysse (BEL)	1	+ 1h 32' 13"
4	Bartolomeo Aimo (ITA)	1	+ 1h 32' 47"
5	Théophile Beeckman (BEL)	1	+ 2h 11' 12"
6	Joseph Muller (FRA)	1	+ 2h 35' 33"
7	Arsène Alancourt (FRA)	1	+ 2h 41' 31"
8	Romain Bellenger (FRA)	1	+ 2h 51' 09"
9	Omer Huyse (BEL)	2	+ 2h 58' 13"
10	Hector Tiberghien (BEL)	1	+ 3h 05' 04"

Final general classification (11–60)
Rank	Rider	Category	Time
11	Philippe Thys (BEL)	1	+ 3h 15' 24"
12	Georges Cuvelier (FRA)	1	+ 3h 21' 45"
13	Ermano Vallazza (ITA)	1	+ 3h 48' 24"
14	Jean Alavoine (FRA)	1	+ 3h 55' 45"
15	Gaston Degy (FRA)	2	+ 5h 11' 48"
16	Raymond Englebert (BEL)	1	+ 5h 20' 11"
17	Alfons Standaert (BEL)	2	+ 5h 41' 48"
18	Louis Mottiat (BEL)	1	+ 5h 54' 19"
19	Ottavio Pratesi (ITA)	Touriste-Routier	+ 6h 00' 04"
20	Lucien Rich (FRA)	1	+ 6h 26' 21"
21	Émile Hardy (BEL)	2	+ 6h 43' 13"
22	Henri Touzard (FRA)	Touriste-Routier	+ 6h 50' 56"
23	Eugène Dhers (FRA)	2	+ 7h 11' 37"
24	Henri Ferrara (FRA)	Touriste-Routier	+ 7h 44' 31"
25	Félix Goethals (FRA)	1	+ 8h 00' 04"
26	Maurice Arnoult (FRA)	Touriste-Routier	+ 12h 29' 46"
27	René Wendels (BEL)	Touriste-Routier	+ 13h 15' 14"
28	Charles Parel (SUI)	Touriste-Routier	+ 14h 50' 28"
29	Charles Cento (FRA)	Touriste-Routier	+ 15h 16' 18"
30	Jaime Janer (ESP)	Touriste-Routier	+ 15h 24' 08"
31	Giovanni Rossignoli (ITA)	Touriste-Routier	+ 15h 54' 56"
32	Giuseppe Ruffoni (ITA)	Touriste-Routier	+ 16h 11' 51"
33	Marie Aubry (FRA)	Touriste-Routier	+ 16h 52' 38"
34	Enrico Sala (ITA)	Touriste-Routier	+ 19h 06' 49"
35	Jean Martinet (SUI)	Touriste-Routier	+ 19h 11' 39"
36	Luigi Vertemati (ITA)	Touriste-Routier	+ 20h 28' 18"
37	Antoine Riera (FRA)	Touriste-Routier	+ 21h 05' 27"
38	Paul Denis (FRA)	Touriste-Routier	+ 22h 11' 50"
39	Jean Garby (FRA)	Touriste-Routier	+ 22h 29' 17"
40	Henri Catelan (FRA)	Touriste-Routier	+ 22h 29' 21"
41	Angelo Erba (ITA)	Touriste-Routier	+ 23h 22' 06"
42	Victorino Otero (ESP)	Touriste-Routier	+ 24h 06' 31"
43	Robert Loret (FRA)	Touriste-Routier	+ 27h 28' 50"
44	Henri Rubert (FRA)	Touriste-Routier	+ 27h 29' 43"
45	Félix Richard (FRA)	Touriste-Routier	+ 27h 39' 21"
46	Vincenzo Bianco (ITA)	Touriste-Routier	+ 27h 52' 14"
47	Emmanuele Luigi (ITA)	Touriste-Routier	+ 28h 24' 17"
48	Maurice Protin (BEL)	Touriste-Routier	+ 29h 06' 03"
49	Georges Kamm (FRA)	Touriste-Routier	+ 29h 08' 30"
50	Mosè Arosio (ITA)	Touriste-Routier	+ 29h 48' 55"
51	Lucien Prudhomme (FRA)	Touriste-Routier	+ 30h 37' 47"
52	Augusto Rho (ITA)	Touriste-Routier	+ 33h 42' 07"
53	Felice Di Gaetano (ITA)	Touriste-Routier	+ 35h 39' 35"
54	Alfred Hersard (FRA)	Touriste-Routier	+ 36h 42' 45"
55	Laurent Devalle (MON)	Touriste-Routier	+ 36h 46' 37"
56	Henri Miège (SUI)	Touriste-Routier	+ 38h 01' 35"
57	Adrien Toussaint (FRA)	Touriste-Routier	+ 41h 30' 49"
58	François Chevalier (FRA)	Touriste-Routier	+ 43h 17' 24"
59	Louis Millo (FRA)	Touriste-Routier	+ 44h 51' 39"
60	Victor Lafosse (FRA)	Touriste-Routier	+ 45h 12' 05"

== Aftermath ==
A few days after Henri Pélissier quit the race, he sent a letter to the communist magazine l'Humanité, writing that he accepted "‘excessive fatigue, suffering, pain" as part of the cycling profession, but that he wanted to be treated as a human being. Tour organiser Desgrange still kept to his formula of trying to get the cyclists to ride individually until 1930, when he accepted that cyclists would run in teams and introduced nationalized teams.

The number of stages increased in the next years. For example, in 1925 the cyclists went from Brest to Bayonne in two stages, racing 900 km (560 mi) in total; in 1926 this was done in four stages, racing 894 km (556 mi). With these shorter stages, the cyclists did not have to start in the middle of the night.

Bottecchia would win the Tour de France again in 1925. The runner-up, Nicolas Frantz, would win in 1927 and 1928; in 1928 he would repeat the feat of Bottecchia of wearing the yellow jersey the entire race.

== Bibliography ==
- Augendre, Jacques (2016). "Guide historique" [Historical guide] (PDF). Tour de France (in French). Paris: Amaury Sport Organisation. Archived (PDF) from the original on 17 August 2016.
- Dauncey, Hugh; Hare, Geoff (2003). The Tour de France, 1903–2003: A Century of Sporting Structures, Meanings and Values. London: Frank Cass & Co. ISBN 978-0-203-50241-9.
