= 1919 Paris–Tours =

Race details
- Dates: 8 June 1919
- Stages: 1
- Distance: 342 km (212.5 mi)
- Winning time: 12h 35' 00"

Results
	Winner	Hector Tiberghien (BEL)
	Second	René Vandenhove (FRA)
	Third	Jean Rossius (BEL)

The 1919 Paris–Tours was the 14th edition of the Paris–Tours cycle race and was held on 8 June 1919. The race started in Paris and finished in Tours. The race was won by Hector Tiberghien.

== General classification ==
Final general classification

Rank	Rider	Time
1	Hector Tiberghien (BEL)	12h 35' 00"
2	René Vandenhove (FRA)	+ 4' 00"
3	Jean Rossius (BEL)	+ 5' 00"
4	Honoré Barthélémy (FRA)	+ 7' 00"
5	Jean Alavoine (FRA)	+ 10' 00"
6	Henri Pélissier (FRA)	+ 10' 00"
7	Alfons Spiessens (BEL)	+ 13' 00"
8	Eugène Christophe (FRA)	+ 14' 00"
9	René Chassot (FRA)	+ 28' 00"
10	Charles Lacquehay (FRA)	+ 36' 00"
