= René Gérard =

René Gérard may refer to:

- René Gérard (footballer), French footballer
- René Gérard (cyclist), French racing cyclist
- René Gérard (propagandist), French WWII antisemitic propagandist

== See also ==
- René Girard, French polymath, historian, literary critic, and philosopher of social science
