= 1923 Paris–Tours =

Race details
- Dates: 13 May 1923
- Stages: 1
- Distance: 342 km (212.5 mi)
- Winning time: 13h 40' 20"

Results
| | Winner | Paul Deman (BEL) |
| | Second | Félix Sellier (BEL) |
| | Third | Hector Tiberghien (BEL) |

The 1923 Paris–Tours was the 18th edition of the Paris–Tours cycle race and was held on 13 May 1923. The race started in Paris and finished in Tours. The race was won by Paul Deman.

== General classification ==
Final general classification

| Rank | Rider | Time |
|---|---|---|
| 1 | Paul Deman (BEL) | 13h 40' 20" |
| 2 | Félix Sellier (BEL) | + 0" |
| 3 | Hector Tiberghien (BEL) | + 0" |
| 4 | Félix Goethals (FRA) | + 45" |
| 5 | Francis Pélissier (FRA) | + 45" |
| 6 | Jean Hillarion (FRA) | + 5' 10" |
| 7 | Romain Bellenger (FRA) | + 5' 20" |
| 8 | Philippe Thys (BEL) | + 9' 40" |
| 9 | Robert Jacquinot (FRA) | + 10' 40" |
| 10 | Jean Rossius (BEL) | + 21' 00" |
