= Robert Loret =

French cyclist

Personal information
- Born: 11 July 1892
- Died: 27 October 1950 (aged 58)

Cycling career
- Sport: Cycling
- Discipline: Road
- Role: Rider

Robert Loret (11 July 1892 – 27 October 1950) was a French racing cyclist. He rode in the 1924 Tour de France.
