= René Wendels =

Belgian cyclist

Personal information
- Born: 1893
- Died: Unknown

Cycling career
- Sport: Cycling
- Discipline: Road
- Role: Rider

René Wendels (born 1893, date of death unknown) was a Belgian racing cyclist. He rode in the 1924 Tour de France.
