= Mosé Arosio =

Italian cyclist

Personal information
- Born: 20 October 1892 Monza, Kingdom of Italy

Cycling career
- Sport: Cycling
- Discipline: Road
- Role: Rider

Mosé Arosio (born 20 October 1892, date of death unknown) was an Italian racing cyclist. He rode in the 1924 Tour de France.
