= Jean Garby =

French cyclist

Personal information
- Born: 21 June 1896
- Died: 14 May 1964 (aged 67)

Cycling career
- Sport: Cycling
- Discipline: Road
- Role: Rider

Jean Garby (21 June 1896 – 14 May 1964) was a French racing cyclist. He rode in the 1924 Tour de France.
