= Joseph Marchand (cyclist) =

Belgian cyclist

Personal information
- Born: 18 June 1892
- Died: 18 January 1935 (aged 42)

Cycling career
- Sport: Cycling
- Role: Rider

Joseph Marchand (18 June 1892 – 18 January 1935) was a Belgian racing cyclist. He rode in the 1922 Tour de France.
