= Lucien Prudhomme =

French cyclist

Personal information
- Born: 20 April 1891
- Died: 23 March 1960 (aged 68)

Cycling career
- Sport: Cycling
- Discipline: Road
- Role: Rider

Lucien Prudhomme (20 April 1891 – 23 March 1960) was a French racing cyclist. He rode in the 1924 Tour de France.
