= Fernand Lemay =

French cyclist (1894–1980)

Personal information
- Born: 1 June 1894
- Died: 31 December 1980 (aged 86)

Cycling career
- Sport: Cycling
- Discipline: Road
- Role: Rider

Fernand Lemay (1 June 1894 – 31 December 1980) was a French racing cyclist. He rode in the 1924 Tour de France. His nephew Fernand was also a professional cyclist, he completed the 1936 Tour de France.
