= Henri Rubert =

French cyclist

Personal information
- Born: 1 December 1899

Cycling career
- Sport: Cycling
- Discipline: Road
- Role: Rider

Henri Rubert (born 1 December 1899, date of death unknown) was a French racing cyclist. He rode in the 1924 Tour de France.
