= Cyriel Omey =

Belgian cyclist

Personal information
- Born: 13 June 1897
- Died: 28 June 1977 (aged 80)

Cycling career
- Sport: Cycling
- Discipline: Road
- Role: Rider

Cyriel Omey (13 June 1897 – 28 June 1977) was a Belgian racing cyclist. He rode in the 1924 Tour de France.
