= Louis Millo =

French cyclist

Personal information
- Born: 5 September 1902
- Died: 30 December 1983 (aged 81)

Cycling career
- Sport: Cycling
- Discipline: Road
- Role: Rider

Louis Millo (5 September 1902 – 30 December 1983) was a French racing cyclist. He rode in the 1924 Tour de France.
