= Felice Di Gaetano =

Italian cyclist

Personal information
- Born: 14 February 1898 Rome, Kingdom of Italy

Cycling career
- Sport: Cycling
- Discipline: Road
- Role: Rider

Felice Di Gaetano (born 14 February 1898, date of death unknown) was an Italian racing cyclist. He rode in the 1924 Tour de France.
