= Fernand Lemay (1913) =

Personal information
- Born: 26 October 1913 Boussières-en-Cambrésis, France
- Died: 13 May 1940 (aged 26) Merdorp, Hannut, Belgium

Cycling career
- Sport: Cycling
- Discipline: Road
- Role: Rider

Professional team
- 1936–1937: Helyett–Hutchinson

Fernand Lemay (26 October 1913 – 13 May 1940) was a French road cyclist, who was professional from 1933 to 1937. He was the nephew of Fernand Lemay who was French cyclo-cross champion in 1924. He was killed during the Battle of Hannut at the beginning of World War II.

== Major results ==
1931
7th Grand Prix de Fourmies
1933
2nd Grand Prix de Fourmies

== Grand Tour Results ==
=== Tour de France ===
- 1936: 30th
