= Victor Lafosse =

French cyclist

Personal information
- Full name: Victor Lafosse

Cycling career
- Sport: Cycling
- Role: Rider

Victor Lafosse was a French racing cyclist. He finished in last place in the 1924 Tour de France.
