= Léon Van Aken =

Belgian cyclist

Personal information
- Born: 6 September 1897 Hoevenen, Belgium
- Died: 13 March 1978 (aged 80) Kapellen, Belgium
- Weight: 73 kg (161 lb)

Cycling career
- Sport: Cycling
- Role: Rider

Professional teams
- 1920-1925: Wonder-Dunlop
- 1926: La Française-Diamant-Dunlop
- 1927: La Française

Léon Van Aken (6 September 1897 – 13 March 1978) was a Belgian racing cyclist. He rode in the 1920 Tour de France. He was born in Hoevenen (Belgium) and was living in Kapellen (Belgium). He participated 3 times at the Tour de France (1920-1922-1923). His best performance in the General Classement was the 28th place in 1922. He was riding for following teams: Wonder-Dunlop (1923-1925) – La Française-Diamant-Dunlop (1926) – La Française (1927).
