= François Chevalier (cyclist) =

French cyclist

Personal information
- Born: 14 May 1893
- Died: 10 January 1983 (aged 89)

Cycling career
- Sport: Cycling
- Role: Rider

François Chevalier (14 May 1893 – 10 January 1983) was a French racing cyclist. He rode in the 1919 Tour de France and also the following years in 1920, 1921, 1922, 1923, 1924, 1925 and 1926.
