= René Vandenhove =

French cyclist

Personal information
- Born: 20 January 1889 Paris, France
- Died: 20 August 1972 (aged 83) Orléans, France

Cycling career
- Sport: Cycling
- Role: Rider

René Vandenhove (20 January 1889 – 20 August 1972) was a French racing cyclist. He rode in the 1919 Tour de France.
