= René Gérard (cyclist) =

French cyclist

Personal information
- Born: 12 November 1894
- Died: 28 June 1976 (aged 81)

Cycling career
- Sport: Cycling
- Discipline: Road
- Role: Rider

René Gérard (12 November 1894 – 28 June 1976) was a French racing cyclist. He rode in the 1924 Tour de France.
