= Adrien-Robert Toussaint =

French cyclist

Personal information
- Born: July 21, 1895
- Died: June 15, 1951 (aged 55)

Cycling career
- Sport: Cycling
- Discipline: Road
- Role: Rider

Adrien-Robert Toussaint (1895, Saizerais – 1951) was a French racing cyclist. He rode in the 1923 Tour de France.
