= Charles Hennuyer =

French cyclist

Personal information
- Born: 7 February 1895
- Died: 11 November 1958 (aged 63)

Cycling career
- Sport: Cycling
- Role: Rider

Charles Hennuyer (7 February 1895 – 11 November 1958) was a French racing cyclist. He rode in the 1921 Tour de France.
