= Charles Loew =

French cyclist

Personal information
- Full name: Carl Gregor Loew
- Born: 2 September 1896 Wasselonne, Bas-Rhin
- Died: 11 July 1935 (aged 38) Saint-Denis, Seine-Saint-Denis

Cycling career
- Sport: Cycling
- Discipline: Road Racing
- Role: Rider

Carl Gregor "Charles" Loew (1896-1935) was a French racing cyclist. He rode in the 1920 Tour de France.
