= Raymond Englebert =

Belgian cyclist

Personal information
- Born: 21 June 1899
- Died: 29 September 1974 (aged 75)

Cycling career
- Sport: Cycling
- Discipline: Road
- Role: Rider

Raymond Englebert (21 June 1899 – 29 September 1974) was a Belgian racing cyclist. He rode in the 1924 Tour de France.
