= Ange-Marie Aubry =

French cyclist

Personal information
- Born: 19 August 1890
- Died: 6 January 1969 (aged 78)

Cycling career
- Sport: Cycling
- Role: Rider

Ange-Marie Aubry (19 August 1890 – 6 January 1969) was a French racing cyclist. He rode in the 1920 Tour de France.
