= Lucien Rich =

French cyclist

Personal information
- Born: 2 November 1892
- Died: 10 October 1976 (aged 83)

Cycling career
- Sport: Cycling
- Discipline: Road
- Role: Rider

Lucien Rich (2 November 1892 – 10 October 1976) was a French racing cyclist. He rode in the 1923 Tour de France.
