= Victor Lenaers =

Belgian cyclist

Personal information
- Born: 12 January 1893 Tongeren, Belgium
- Died: 12 November 1968 (aged 75) Tongeren, Belgium

Cycling career
- Sport: Cycling
- Discipline: Road
- Role: Rider

Victor Lenaers (12 January 1893 – 12 November 1968) was a Belgian racing cyclist. He competed in the Tour de France from 1921 to 1924.

== Major results ==
1921
1921 Tour de France:

6th place overall classification

1922
1922 Tour de France:

5th place overall classification
