= Léon Despontin =

Belgian cyclist

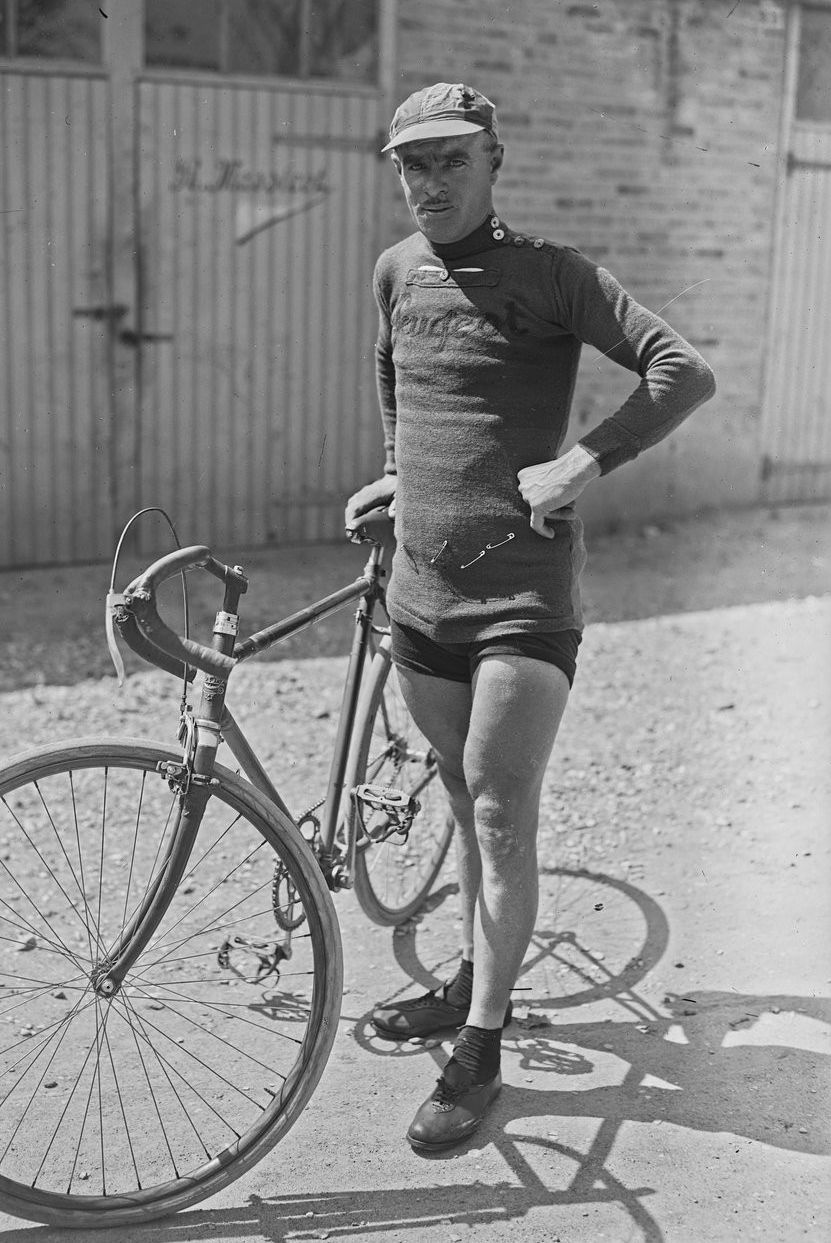

Personal information
- Born: 6 July 1888
- Died: 7 August 1972 (aged 84)

Cycling career
- Sport: Cycling
- Role: Rider

Léon Despontin (6 July 1888 – 7 August 1972) was a Belgian racing cyclist. He rode in the 1921 Tour de France. He placed seventh in the race with 200 points.
