= Théophile Beeckman =

Belgian cyclist

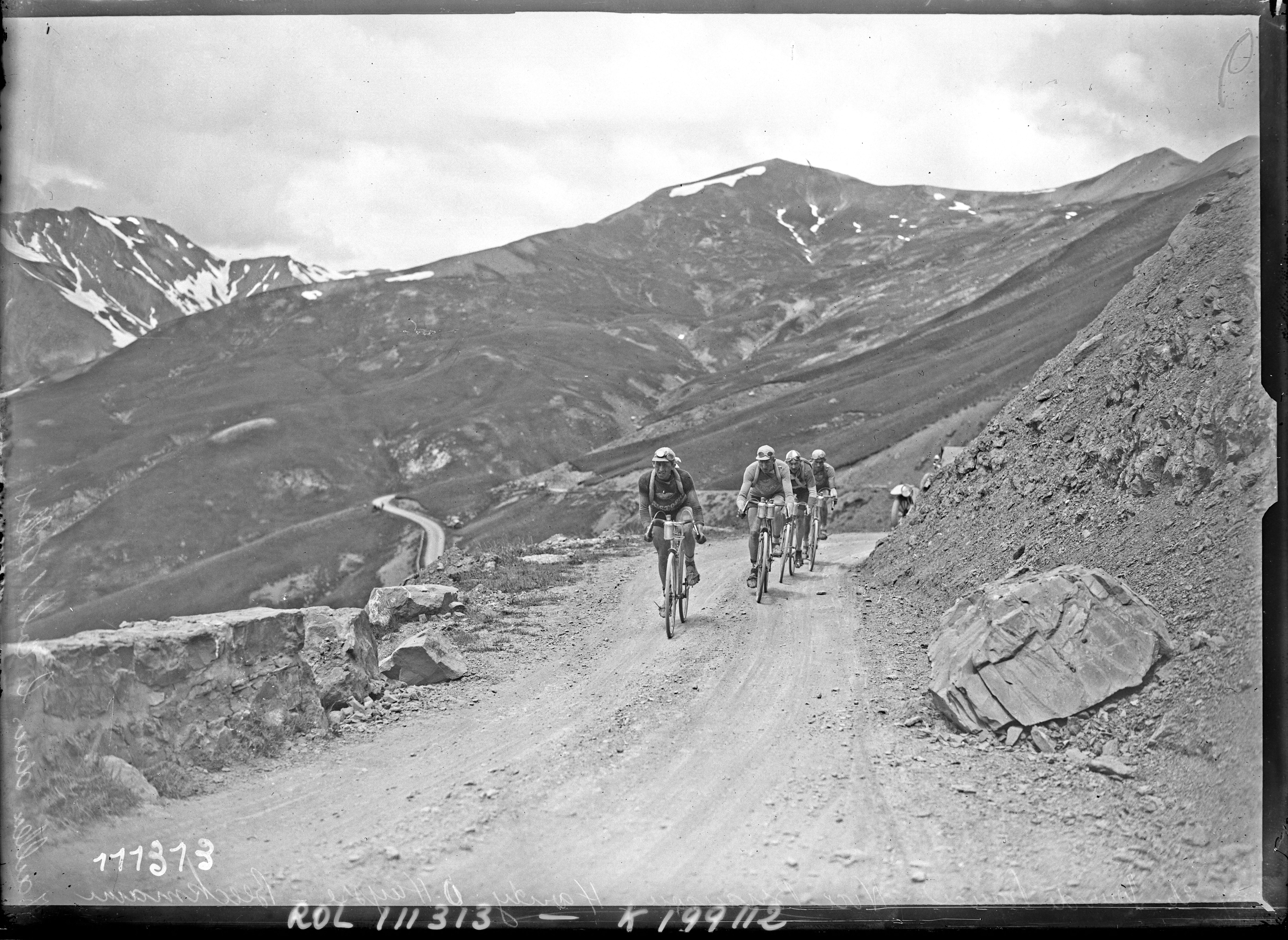
- Beeckman in this group at Col d'Allos during the Nice-Briançon stage at the Tour de France on 14 July 1926.

Personal information
- Full name: Théophile Beeckman
- Born: 1 November 1896 Meerbeke, Belgium
- Died: 22 November 1955 (aged 59)

Cycling career
- Sport: Cycling
- Discipline: Road
- Role: Rider

Major wins
- 2 stages Tour de France

Théophile Beeckman (1 November 1896, in Meerbeke – 22 November 1955, in Meerbeke) was a Belgian professional road bicycle racer.

== Major results ==
1922
Heure le Romain - Malmédy - Heure le Romain
1924
Tour de France:

Winner stage 3
5th place overall classification

1925
Tour de France:

Winner stage 10
6th place overall classification

1926
Tour de France:

4th place overall classification
