= Félix Sellier =

Belgian cyclist

- Sellier in 1925

Personal information
- Full name: Félix Sellier
- Nickname: le minneur
- Born: 2 January 1893 Spy, Belgium
- Died: 16 April 1965 (aged 72) Gembloux, Belgium

Cycling career
- Sport: Cycling
- Discipline: Road
- Role: Rider

Major wins
- Paris–Brussels (1922, 1923, 1924); Paris–Roubaix (1925); Belgian National Road Race Champion; 3 stages Tour de France

Félix Sellier (2 January 1893 in Spy – 16 April 1965 in Gembloux) was a Belgian professional road bicycle racer.

== Stage victory in 1921 Tour de France ==
In the 1921 Tour de France, the cyclists were separated in two classes, the sponsored riders and the unsponsored riders. For the thirteenth stage, these classes started separated, partly because the Tour organisers wanted to punish the sponsored riders for not attacking the leader Léon Scieur, and partly because the leader in the second class was helped by cyclists in the first class. Sellier was one of the riders in the second class, and therefore could start two hours earlier than the favourites. Some of the second class cyclists including Sellier stayed ahead, and Sellier managed to win the stage. Sellier would finish 8th overall of the second class cyclists, and 16th in the overall combined classification.

In the next year, Sellier started the Tour de France as sponsored cyclist. He again won a stage, but this time he had started at the same time as everybody else. He finished the race in third place.

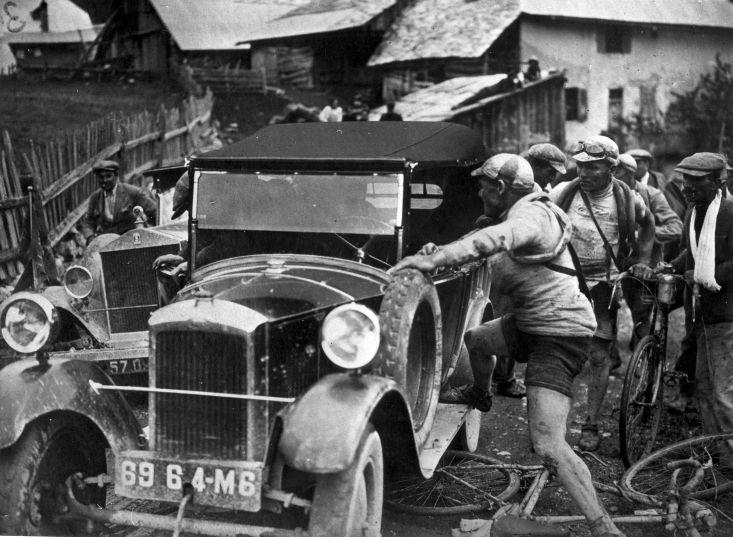
Sellier discussing with a car driver after a collision during the 1920 Tour de France

== Major results ==
1912
Binche-Tournai-Binche
1919
Tour of Belgium (independents)
1920
Marchienne-au-Pont
Mellet
Moustier
1921
Jemeppe-Bastogne-Jemeppe
Tour de France:

Winner stage 13

1922
Tour de France:

Winner stage 14
3rd overall classification

Paris–Brussels
Arlon-Oostende
1923
Criterium du midi
(Belgium) Belgian National Road Race Championships
Paris–Brussels
1924
Gembloux
Oupeye
Paris-Lyon
Tour of Belgium
Paris–Brussels
1925
Gembloux
GP de soissons
Paris–Roubaix
1926
(Belgium) Belgian National Road Race Championships
Tour de France:

Winner stage 4

1927
Gembloux
1928
Six days of Brussels (with Henri Duray)
St. Servais
