= Hector Tiberghien =

Belgian cyclist

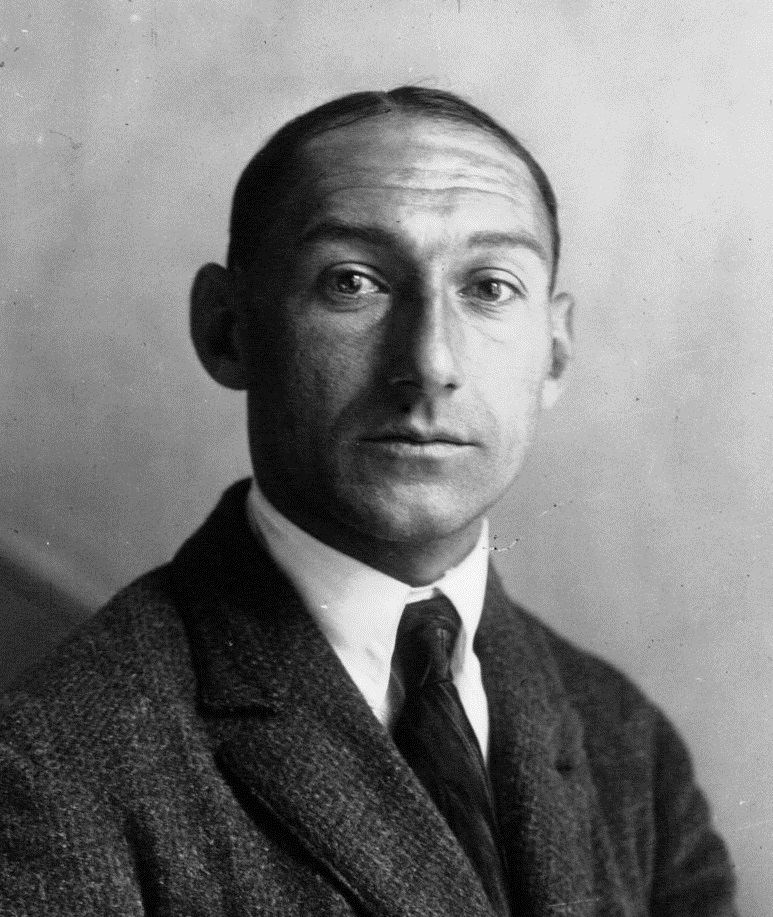
- Hector Tiberghien, 1921

Personal information
- Full name: Hector Tiberghien
- Born: 19 February 1888 Wattrelos
- Died: 17 August 1951 (aged 63) Neuilly-sur-Seine

Cycling career
- Sport: Cycling
- Discipline: Road
- Role: Rider

Professional teams
- 1912: Griffon
- 1913: Peugeot
- 1914: Delage - Continental
- 1921: La Sportive
- 1922-1924: Peugeot

Major wins
- Paris–Tours (1923)

Hector Tiberghien (19 February 1888 in Wattrelos – 17 August 1951 in Neuilly-sur-Seine) was a Belgian cyclist.

He won Paris–Tours in 1919 and participated in eight Tours de France.

== Major results ==
1919

Paris–Tours

1923

3rd Paris–Tours
4th Tour de France

== Results in the Tour de France ==
- 1912: 7th
- 1914: 18th
- 1919: DNF
- 1920: DNF
- 1921: 5th
- 1922: 6th
- 1923: 4th
- 1924: 10th
