= Arsène Alancourt =

French cyclist

Personal information
- Full name: Arsène Alancourt
- Born: 29 February 1892 Clichy, France
- Died: 20 April 1965 (aged 73) Clichy, France

Cycling career
- Sport: Cycling
- Discipline: Road
- Role: Rider

Professional team
- 1927: Alleluia

Major wins
- One stage Tour de France

Arsène Alancourt (29 February 1892 – 20 April 1965) was a French professional road bicycle racer. He won one stage in the 1924 Tour de France, and rode his best general classification in 1923 when he finished 5th.

Alancourt was born in Clichy, Hauts-de-Seine, Paris and also died there aged 73.

== Major results ==
1922
13th Tour de France
1923
5th Tour de France
1924
7th Tour de France

1st Stage 13

1925
3rd Paris-Nancy
1926
2nd Paris-Contres
1927
1st GP Wolber
1st Paris-Vichy
1st Paris-Contres
3rd Paris-Rennes
1928
1st Stage 1, Tour du Sud-Est
2nd Paris-Caen
3rd Paris-Longwy
