= Jean Alavoine =

French cyclist (1888–1943)

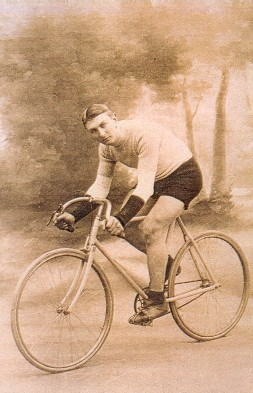
- Jean Alavoine in the early 1910s

Personal information
- Full name: Jean Alavoine
- Nickname: Gars Jean (Jean the guy)
- Born: 1 April 1888 Roubaix, France
- Died: 18 July 1943 (aged 55) Argenteuil, France

Cycling career
- Sport: Cycling
- Discipline: Road
- Role: Rider

Professional team
- 1909–1925: –

Major wins
- 17 stages in the Tour de France

Jean Alavoine (1 April 1888 – 18 July 1943) was a French professional cyclist, who won 17 stages in the Tour de France - only eight riders have won more stages - and wore the yellow jersey for five days.

Jean Alavoine was born in Roubaix on 1 April 1888. In his professional career from 1908 to 1925, he won 29 courses, including 17 Tour de France stages. In the 1922 Tour de France, he won three stages in a row, stages 5–6-7, and wore the yellow jersey. In stage 11, still leading the race, Alavoine had mechanical problems and his lead dropped to 6:53 minutes. In stage 12 Alavoine lost 37 minutes and the lead. In the end, he finished the tour in second place. In 1943 he died during a veteran race in Argenteuil.

== Major results ==
1909
(France) French national road race champion
Tour de France:

3rd place general classification
Winner stages 8 and 14

1912
Tour de France:

5th place general classification
Winner stages 11, 13 and 15

1913
Tour de France: did not finish
1914
Tour de France:

3rd place general classification
Winner stage 7

1919
Tour de France:

2nd place general classification
Winner stages 4, 5, 7, 8 and 15

Circuit des Champs de Bataille

entered

1920
(France) French national road race champion
Tour de France: did not finish
Giro d'Italia:

3rd place overall classification
Winner stages 4 and 6

1921
Tour de France: did not finish
1922
Tour de France:

2nd place general classification
Winner stages 5, 6 and 7

1923
Tour de France:

did not finish
Winner stages 6, 7 and 9

1924
Tour de France:

14th place general classification

1925
Tour de France:

13th place general classification
