= Gaston Degy =

French cyclist

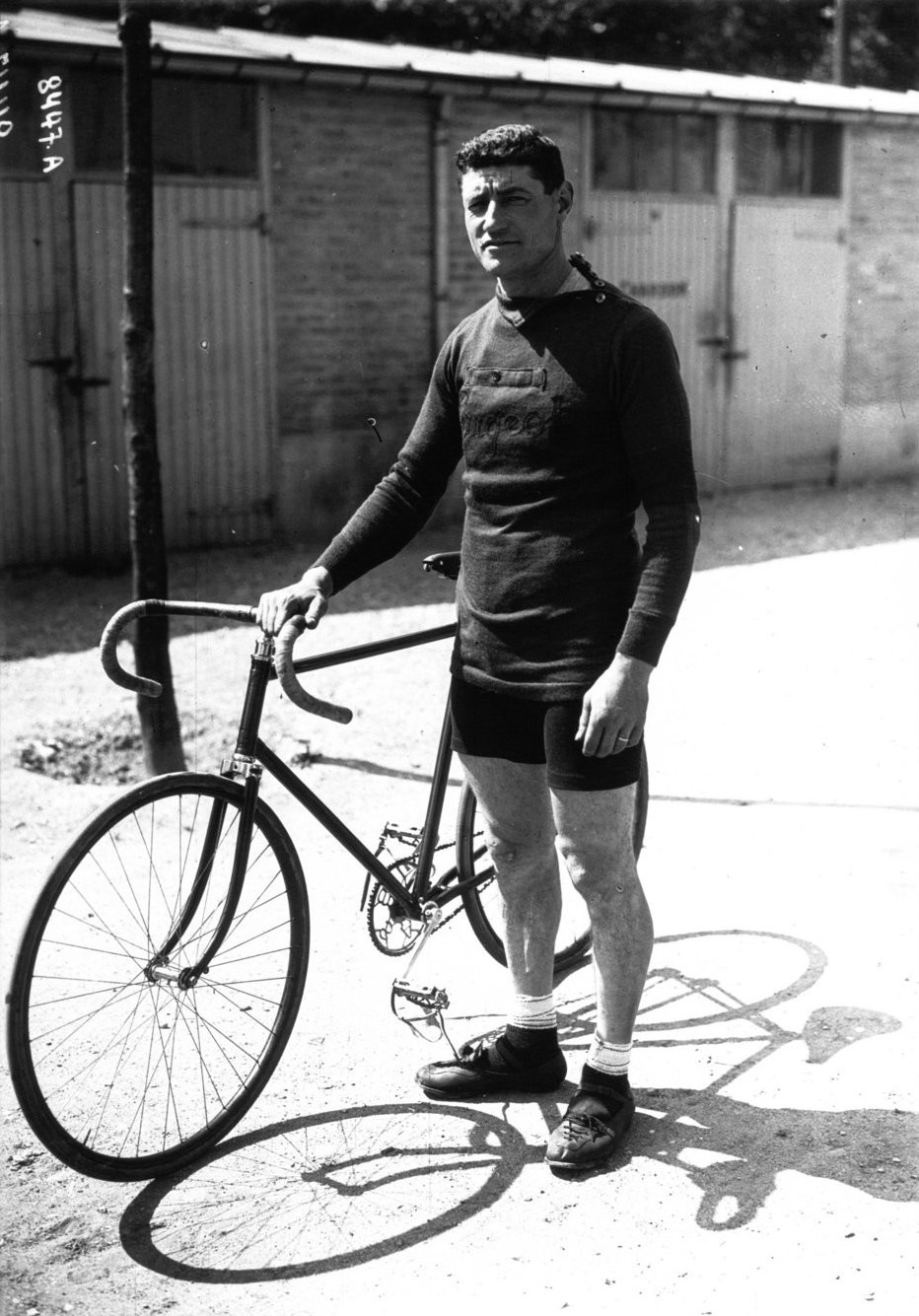

Personal information
- Born: 3 April 1890
- Died: 2 February 1964 (aged 73)

Cycling career
- Sport: Cycling
- Disciplines: Road; Cyclo-cross
- Role: Rider

Professional teams
- 1914: Automoto–Continental
- 1922: Peugeot–Wolber
- 1923: Griffon
- 1923–1925: Aiglon–Dunlop
- 1926: Opel–Pollack

Gaston Degy (3 April 1890 – 2 February 1964) was a French racing cyclist. He rode in five editions of the Tour de France, with his best result being 10th in 1922.

== Major results ==
=== Road ===
1909
3rd Paris-Évreux
1922
10th Overall Tour de France
1923
3rd Paris-Angers
7th Paris–Roubaix
1924
7th Paris–Roubaix

=== Cyclo-cross ===
1919–1920
1st National Championships
1921–1922
2nd National Championships
1923–1924
1st Critérium international de cyclo-cross
2nd National Championships
