= 1923 Giro d'Italia =

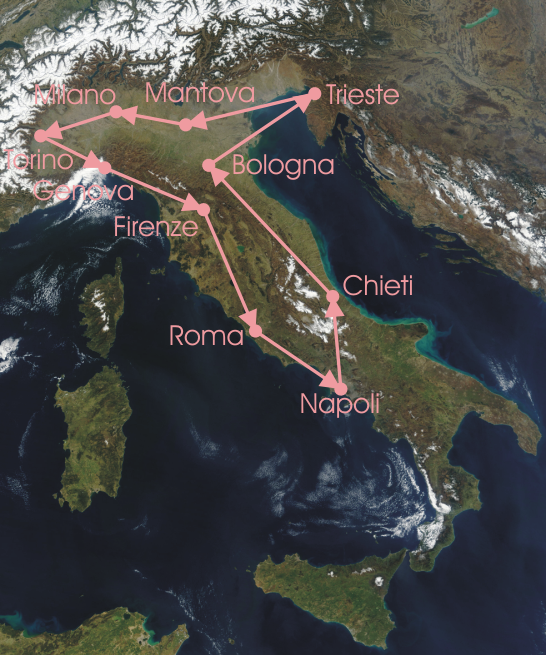
- Route of the 11th Giro d'Italia, run anti-clockwise from Milan to Milan

Race details
- Dates: 23 May - 10 June 1923
- Stages: 10
- Distance: 3,202.7 km (1,990 mi)
- Winning time: 143h 43' 37"

Results
| | Winner | Costante Girardengo (ITA) | (Maino) |
| | Second | Giovanni Brunero (ITA) | (Legnano) |
| | Third | Bartolomeo Aymo (ITA) | (Atala) |
| | Team | Legnano | |

The 1923 Giro d'Italia was the 11th edition of the Giro d'Italia, a Grand Tour organized and sponsored by the newspaper La Gazzetta dello Sport. The race began on 23 May in Milan with a stage that stretched 328 km (204 mi) to Turin, finishing back in Milan on 10 June after a 341.3 km (212 mi) stage and a total distance covered of 3,202.7 km (1,990 mi). The race was won by the Italian rider Costante Girardengo of the Maino team. Second and third respectively were the Italian riders Giovanni Brunero and Bartolomeo Aymo.

This year saw the debutant Ottavio Bottecchia finish in 5th place overall, and the leading 'isolate' (rider without a team). Bottecchia caught the attention of French rider Henri Pélissier, who instigated his glorious Tour de France career.

== Participants ==
Of the 96 or 97 riders that began the Giro d'Italia on 23 May, 38 of them made it to the finish in Milan on 10 June. Riders were allowed to ride on their own or as a member of a team. There were three teams that competed in the race: Atala, Legnano, and Maino.

The peloton was completely composed of Italians. The field featured two former Giro d'Italia champions in the 1919 Giro d'Italia winner Costante Girardengo and returning champion Giovanni Brunero. Other notable Italian riders that started the race included Bartolomeo Aymo, Ottavio Bottecchia, Angelo Gremo, and Giovanni Rossignoli.

In 1923, the best amateurs could ride as guests in a professional team, these riders were called 'fuoriclassi amatoriali'.

== Race summary ==
In the first stage, a group of eight riders with all the favourites distanced themselves 11 minutes from all other riders. Girardengo won the sprint, and became the first leader.

The second stage was won by Aymo, almost a minute ahead of his rivals. Aymo became the new leader.

In the third stage, Linotti and Girardengo crossed the finish line very close to each other, and the jury could not determine who had won; both were declared winner. Two days later, the Italian Cycling Federation declared Girardengo to be the winner of the stage.

Girardengo also won the fourth and fifth stages, both ending in a bunch sprint. Because Aymo finished in the bunch both times, he remained leader.

In the sixth stage, Girardengo escpaed with Brunero, and won the sprint. Aymo finished multiple minutes behind, and lost his lead; Girardengo became leader again.

In the following stages, Girardengo was dominant, winning all of them except the ninth stage where he was narrowly beaten by Sivocci in a sprint. Girardengo thus became the clear winner of the Giro, winning eight of ten stages.

== Final standings ==
=== Stage results ===
Stage results
| Stage | Date | Course | Distance | Type (Note: In 1923, there was no distinction in the rules between plain stages and mountain stages; the icons shown here indicate that the first, second, third, fourth, sixth, and tenth stages included major mountains.) | Winner | Race Leader |
|---|---|---|---|---|---|---|
| 1 | 23 May | Milan to Turin | 328 km (204 mi) | Stage with mountain(s) | Costante Girardengo (ITA) | Costante Girardengo (ITA) |
| 2 | 25 May | Turin to Genoa | 312.9 km (194 mi) | Stage with mountain(s) | Bartolomeo Aymo (ITA) | Bartolomeo Aymo (ITA) |
| 3 | 27 May | Genoa to Florence | 265 km (165 mi) | Stage with mountain(s) | Costante Girardengo (ITA) | Bartolomeo Aymo (ITA) |
| 4 | 29 May | Florence to Rome | 288.7 km (179 mi) | Stage with mountain(s) | Costante Girardengo (ITA) | Bartolomeo Aymo (ITA) |
| 5 | 31 May | Rome to Naples | 281.5 km (175 mi) | Plain stage | Costante Girardengo (ITA) | Bartolomeo Aymo (ITA) |
| 6 | 2 June | Naples to Chieti | 283.1 km (176 mi) | Stage with mountain(s) | Costante Girardengo (ITA) | Costante Girardengo (ITA) |
| 7 | 4 June | Chieti to Bologna | 383 km (238 mi) | Plain stage | Costante Girardengo (ITA) | Costante Girardengo (ITA) |
| 8 | 6 June | Bologna to Trieste | 362.2 km (225 mi) | Plain stage | Costante Girardengo (ITA) | Costante Girardengo (ITA) |
| 9 | 8 June | Trieste to Mantua | 357 km (222 mi) | Plain stage | Alfredo Sivocci (ITA) | Costante Girardengo (ITA) |
| 10 | 10 June | Mantua to Milan | 341.3 km (212 mi) | Stage with mountain(s) | Costante Girardengo (ITA) | Costante Girardengo (ITA) |
| | Total | | 3,202.7 km (1,990 mi) | | | |

=== General classification ===
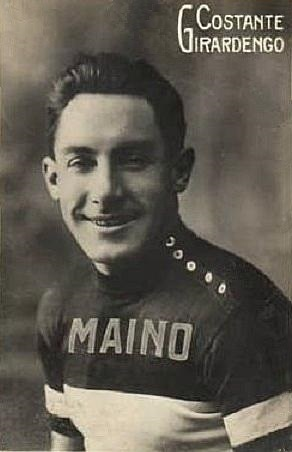
Costante Girardengo won the Giro and also won eight of the ten stages.

There were 38 cyclists who had completed all ten stages. For these cyclists, the times they had needed in each stage was added up for the general classification. The cyclist with the least accumulated time was the winner. Ottavio Bottecchia won the prize for best ranked independent rider in the general classification.

Final general classification (1–10)
| Rank | Name | Team | Time |
|---|---|---|---|
| 1 | Costante Girardengo (ITA) | Maino | 122h 28' 17" |
| 2 | Giovanni Brunero (ITA) | Legnano-Pirelli | + 37" |
| 3 | Bartolomeo Aymo (ITA) | Atala | + 10' 25" |
| 4 | Federico Gay (ITA) | Atala | + 41' 25" |
| 5 | Ottavio Bottecchia (ITA) | — | + 45' 49" |
| 6 | Giuseppe Enrici (ITA) | Legnano-Pirelli | + 49' 30" |
| 7 | Michele Gordini (ITA) | Ganna | + 52' 15" |
| 8 | Emilio Petiva (ITA) | Maino | + 55' 17" |
| 9 | Giovanni Trentarossi (ITA) | Berrettini | + 1h 00' 29" |
| 10 | Angelo Gremo (ITA) | Maino | + 1h 12' 06" |

Final general classification (11–38)
| Rank | Name | Team | Time |
|---|---|---|---|
| 11 | Alfredo Sivocci (ITA) | Legnano | + 1h 16' 33" |
| 12 | Pierino Bestetti (ITA) | Berettini | + 1h 20' 58" |
| 13 | Secondo Martinetto (ITA) | — | + 1h 21' 54" |
| 14 | Giovanni Tragella (ITA) | — | + 1h 41' 51" |
| 15 | Guido Messeri (ITA) | — | + 1h 52' 42" |
| 16 | Ottavio Pratesi (ITA) | Lygie | + 1h 53' 39" |
| 17 | Saverio Dartardi (ITA) | — | + 1h 58' 38" |
| 18 | Giovanni Rossignoli (ITA) | — | + 2h 21' 44" |
| 19 | Pietro Fasoli (ITA) | — | + 2h 58' 57" |
| 20 | Angiolo Marchi (ITA) | — | + 3h 11' 00" |
| 21 | Alessandro Tonani (ITA) | Maino | + 3h 17' 22" |
| 22 | Angelo Veneis (ITA) | — | + 3h 28' 29" |
| 23 | Pasquale Di Pietro (ITA) | — | + 3h 59' 51" |
| 24 | Gianbattista Gilli (ITA) | — | + 4h 08' 49" |
| 25 | Luigi Lucotti (ITA) | — | + 4h 28' 36" |
| 26 | Ugo Ruggeri (ITA) | — | + 4h 36' 23" |
| 27 | Domenico Schierano (ITA) | — | + 4h 37' 00" |
| 28 | Otello Massaro (ITA) | — | + 5h 31' 51" |
| 29 | Enrico Sala (ITA) | — | + 5h 45' 00" |
| 30 | Giuseppe Ruffoni (ITA) | — | + 6h 10' 56" |
| 31 | Menotti Vaccari (ITA) | — | + 6h 13' 13" |
| 32 | Romolo Lazzaretti (ITA) | — | + 6h 35' 25" |
| 33 | Arturo Ferrario (ITA) | — | + 7h 58' 21" |
| 34 | Antonio Buelli (ITA) | — | + 9h 28' 07" |
| 35 | Clemente Canepari (ITA) | — | + 8h 59' 38" |
| 36 | Telesforo Benaglia (ITA) | — | + 10h 46' 52" |
| 37 | Giuseppe Borghi (ITA) | — | + 11h 09' 48" |
| 38 | Giusto Scherl (ITA) | — | + 11h 51' 19" |
