= History of the Giro d'Italia =

The Giro d'Italia (Italian pronunciation: [ˈdʒiːro diˈtaːlja]; Tour of Italy) is an annual stage race bicycle race primarily held in Italy, while also occasionally passing through nearby countries. The race was first organized in 1909 to increase sales of the newspaper La Gazzetta dello Sport; however it is currently run by RCS Sport. The race has been held annually since its first edition in 1909, except when it was stopped for the two world wars. As the Giro gained prominence and popularity the race was lengthened, and the peloton expanded from primarily Italian participation to riders from all over the world.

The first edition of the race was won by Italian Luigi Ganna who had the fewest total points at the end of the race; the same format was used for the next two years and also resulted in an Italian cyclist winning. The 1912 Giro saw the general classification contested by teams, which Atala–Dunlop won by ten points. The following year they reverted to the original system, before switching to the aggregate time model in 1914. Alfredo Binda won five editions of the race over a period of nine years, before Gino Bartali and Fausto Coppi consistently asserted their superiority in the Giro d'Italia. Italians dominated the race for forty years before the first non-Italian, Hugo Koblet, in 1950.

After Koblet became the first foreigner to win the Giro, the Italians won the majority of the races held until 1968. In 1968, the Belgian Eddy Merckx won his first Giro d'Italia, which were soon followed by four more victories. Bernard Hinault won the first of his three Giros d'Italia in 1980. Ireland's Stephen Roche won the 1987 race en route to winning the Triple Crown of Cycling. Spanish rider Miguel Induráin won two consecutive Giros d'Italia, in 1992 and 1993, with his victories being followed by wins by Evgeni Berzin, Tony Rominger, and Pavel Tonkov. The next ten editions of the race were won by Italian riders, including the likes of Marco Pantani, Paolo Savoldelli, and Gilberto Simoni.

Spain's Alberto Contador won the 2008 Giro d'Italia en route to completing the rare Giro-Vuelta double for the season. The 2009 race celebrated the hundredth year since the first edition of the Giro d'Italia and was won by the Russian Denis Menchov. The following year saw Ivan Basso win his second overall race. Contador originally won the 2011 Giro d'Italia, but after a positive drug test result was found, his victory was stripped and given to Michele Scarponi. Vincenzo Nibali, the winner of the 2013 race, led the event from the race's eighth stage and on.

== 1908–1909: The idea and first race ==
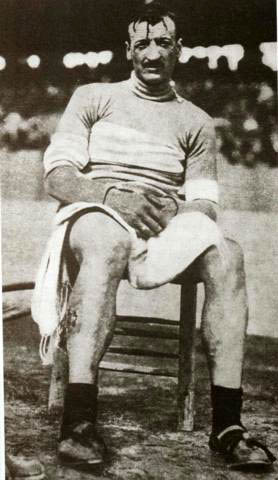
Luigi Ganna the winner of the inaugural Giro d'Italia.

The idea of the holding a bicycle race that navigated around Italy was first suggested when La Gazzetta dello Sport editor Tullo Morgagni sent a telegram to both the paper's owner, Emilio Costamagna, and cycling editor, Armando Cougnet, stating the need for an Italian tour. At the time La Gazzetta's rival, Corriere della Sera was planning on holding a bicycle race of its own, after the success they had gained from holding an automobile race. Morgagni then decided to try and hold their race before Corriere della Sera could hold theirs, but La Gazzetta lacked the money. However, after the success La Gazzetta had with creating the Giro di Lombardia and Milan–San Remo, the owner Costamagna decided to go through with the idea. Their bike race was announced on August 7, 1908 in the first page of that day's edition of La Gazzetta dello Sport. The race was to be held in May 1909. The idea of the race was inspired by the Tour de France and the success that L'Auto had gained from it.

Since the organizers lacked the funds, 25,000 lira, needed to hold the race, they consulted Primo Bongrani, an accountant at the bank Cassa di Risparmio and friend of the three organizers. Bongrani proceeded to go around Italy asking for donations to help hold the race. Bongrani's efforts were largely successful, he had procured enough money to cover the operating costs. The money that was to be given out as prizes came from a casino in San Remo after Francesco Sghirla, a former Gazzetta employee, encouraged it to contribute to the race. Even Corriere, La Gazzetta's rival, gave 3,000 lire to the race's fund.

On 13 May 1909 at 02:53 am 127 riders started the first Giro d'Italia at Loreto Place in Milan. The race was split into eight stages covering 2,448 km (1,521 mi). A total of 49 riders finished, with Italian Luigi Ganna winning. Ganna won three individual stages and the General Classification. Ganna received 5325 lira as a winner's prize, with the last rider in the general classification receiving 300 lira. The Giro's director received only 150 lira a month, 150 lira fewer than the last-placed rider.

== 1910–1953: Italian domination ==
During these years, and up until 1950, the winners of the Giro d'Italia were exclusively of Italian descent. The inaugural race was such a success that the organizers added two more stages and over 500 km (311 mi) to the race. In addition, the organizers restructured the point distribution to determine the overall leader; the stage winner would get one point for finishing first, second place got two points, and so on until the 51st and up finishers, who would just receive 51 points. The first non-Italian stage winner, Jean-Baptiste Dortignacq, came in the 1910 edition of the race; he won the second stage of the race. Carlo Galetti led from stage two until the finish. The 1911 Giro d'Italia was the first Giro to not have the start or finish of the race in Milan. The start and finish for the race was moved to the Italian capital Rome to celebrate Italy's 50th anniversary of unification. This race also saw the first foreign rider to lead the race, the Frenchmen Lucien Petit-Breton, as well as the first repeat winner of the race in Carlo Galetti.

The 1912 Giro d'Italia saw some big changes to how the general classification was to be run; the race was to be centered around the team instead of the individual, meaning that the leader of the race would be a single team. Teams were allowed only four riders for each squad and were awarded points towards the general classification based on stage placings. The changes to the general classification were met with strong opposition from the start. Fourteen teams lined up at the start in Milan. Atala–Dunlop, which consisted of Luigi Ganna, Carlo Galetti, Eberardo Pavesi, and Giovanni Micheletto, led the race in all but one stage. Ganna was the only member of Atala–Dunlop that didn't finish the race, as he dropped out during the fifth stage. Galetti became the first three-time winner of the Giro d'Italia.

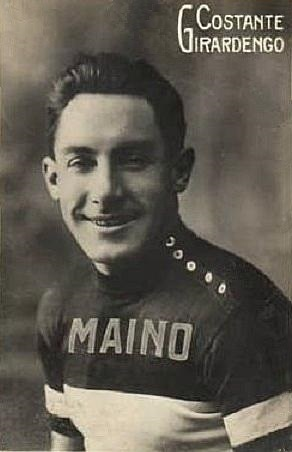
Costante Girardengo was the first rider to lead a Giro d'Italia from start to finish.

The following year's race was the last Giro to be run with a points system. The race saw the first appearance of Costante Girardengo, who won the sixth stage, and would come to dominate the Giro in the future. Carlo Oriani — who had just gotten out of serving the Italian military in the Italo-Turkish War — won the event by six points over the second-place finisher, Eberardo Pavesi. The 1914 Giro d'Italia saw the calculation of the general classification shift from a points system to a time based system. In the new system, every rider's finishing time for each stage is totaled together and the rider with the lowest total time is the overall leader. Out of the eighty-one riders entered the race only eight of them finished. The grueling race was won by Alfonso Calzolari, who won by almost two hours over the second-place finisher. A Giro was planned for 1915, but the plans were scrapped when Italy entered World War I.

After the Great War ended, the race resumed in 1919. This edition of the race navigated through the ruined parts of Northern Italy, which made it hard for the organizers and riders. Costante Girardengo — the eventual winner — became the first rider to lead the Giro from start to finish. En route to winning overall, Girardengo won seven of the ten stages that composed the event. In addition, the Belgian Marcel Buysse became the first foreigner to finish on the podium; Buysse finished third overall, over an hour slower than Girardengo. The following year's Giro began with close to fifty riders and finished with ten. The first stage of the 1920 Giro d'Italia briefly went into Switzerland, which was the first time that the Giro had ever left its home country of Italy. Girardengo came into the race the favorite, but injuries sustained from crashing in the second stage forced him to withdraw. During the second stage, Gaetano Belloni capitalized on Girardengo's, race leader Giuseppe Olivieri's, Carlo Galetti's withdrawal to win the second stage and take the lead. Belloni, known by many as "the Eternal Second, went on to win the Giro and proved he could win a race.

Costante Girardengo won the first four stages of the 1921 Giro d'Italia and was leader after the fourth day. During the fifth stage, Girardengo was involved in a crash, and when Gaetano Belloni saw this, he attacked. Girardengo chased for 60 km (37 mi) before quitting. Belloni was then the new leader after stage 5's conclusion. After the fifth stage, Giovanni Brunero was the only rider close to Belloni. Brunero attacked during the race's seventh stage to win the day and take the overall lead by fifty-two seconds, which proved enough to last until the race's conclusion in Milan. The 1922 Giro d'Italia saw some controversy amongst the general classification contenders. In the race's first stage, Giovanni Brunero received an illegal wheel change – Brunero took a wheel from his teammate Alfredo Sivocci – which he was penalized 25 minutes for. Costante Girardengo and Gaetono Belloni, along with their respective teams Maino and Bianchi, wanted Brunero to be expelled from the Giro for the incident. Both the Bianchi and Maino squads eventually withdrew from the Giro due to their outrage with the organizer's decision to only give Brunero a 25-minute penalty. Brunero went on to win the Giro d'Italia, the second one of his career.

The 1923 Giro d'Italia was dominated by Costante Girardengo, who won eight out of the ten race's stages. Despite the large number of stage victories, Girardengo's margin of victory was thirty-seven seconds over the second-place finisher Giovanni Brunero. This was Girardengo's second career Giro victory. Girardengo, Brunero, and Gaetano Belloni didn't start the 1924 edition due to an argument over their compensation. Their decision not to participate gave the other general classification hopefuls a bigger chance to win the Giro. After the event's eighth leg that saw awful road and weather conditions, Giuseppe Enrici emerged as the overall leader and eventual winner. In addition, this Giro saw the first and only woman ever to compete in the race's history in Alfonsina Strada. She was eliminated from the race after the seventh stage; however, the organizers allowed her to continue the race thought she wouldn't be included in the general classification. Strada made it all the way to the event's finish in Milan and finished around twenty hours slower than the winner Enrici.

=== 1925–1935: The Binda years ===
The 1925 Giro d'Italia saw the emergence of a new star, Alfredo Binda. Despite winning six legs of the event, Costante Girardengo did not win the race. Binda gained the lead after the fifth stage, after he and a few other general classification contenders attacked while Girardengo was repairing a flat tire. Binda won the Giro in his first attempt. Reigning champion Binda started off the following year's race with a crash in the first stage, which cost him much time. Due to the crash, Binda worked as a domestique for his teammate Giovanni Brunero. With Binda's aid, Brunero won the whole event, while Binda won six stages.

Before the 1927 Giro d'Italia, the organizers made some changes: the stage winner now received a one-minute time bonus and stages were now occasionally run on consecutive days, where before they had at least one rest day before each stage. The event witnessed Alfredo Binda win twelve stages and lead the race from start to finish en route to his second overall victory. Binda's record of twelve stage wins in a single Giro still stands. Binda returned the next year to win six of the twelve stages, along with the race as a whole. He first captured the lead after the fourth stage, where he significantly distanced himself from his competitors. Binda became the second person to win three Giro d'Italias in their career. In addition, the event saw a record number of participants at 298 riders, of which 126 finished the race.

In 1929 Alfredo Binda won a record eight consecutive stages on the way to his third consecutive, and fourth career, Giro d'Italia victory. This Giro began in Rome, which was the second time that the Giro had not started in Milan in the history of its running. When Binda came to the finish in Milan, he was booed by some of the spectators. The next year, Binda was paid 22,500 lire — the same amount of money the winner of the Giro would get — not to participate in the Giro. Binda's absence left the field open for everyone else. The eventual winner, Luigi Marchisio, gained the lead after winning the third stage of the race. Marchisio held a slim fifty-two second lead for the last six stages of the race to the finish in Milan. Marchisio became the youngest rider to win the Giro at 21 years, 1 month, and 13 days; his record stood for ten years before being broken by Fausto Coppi.

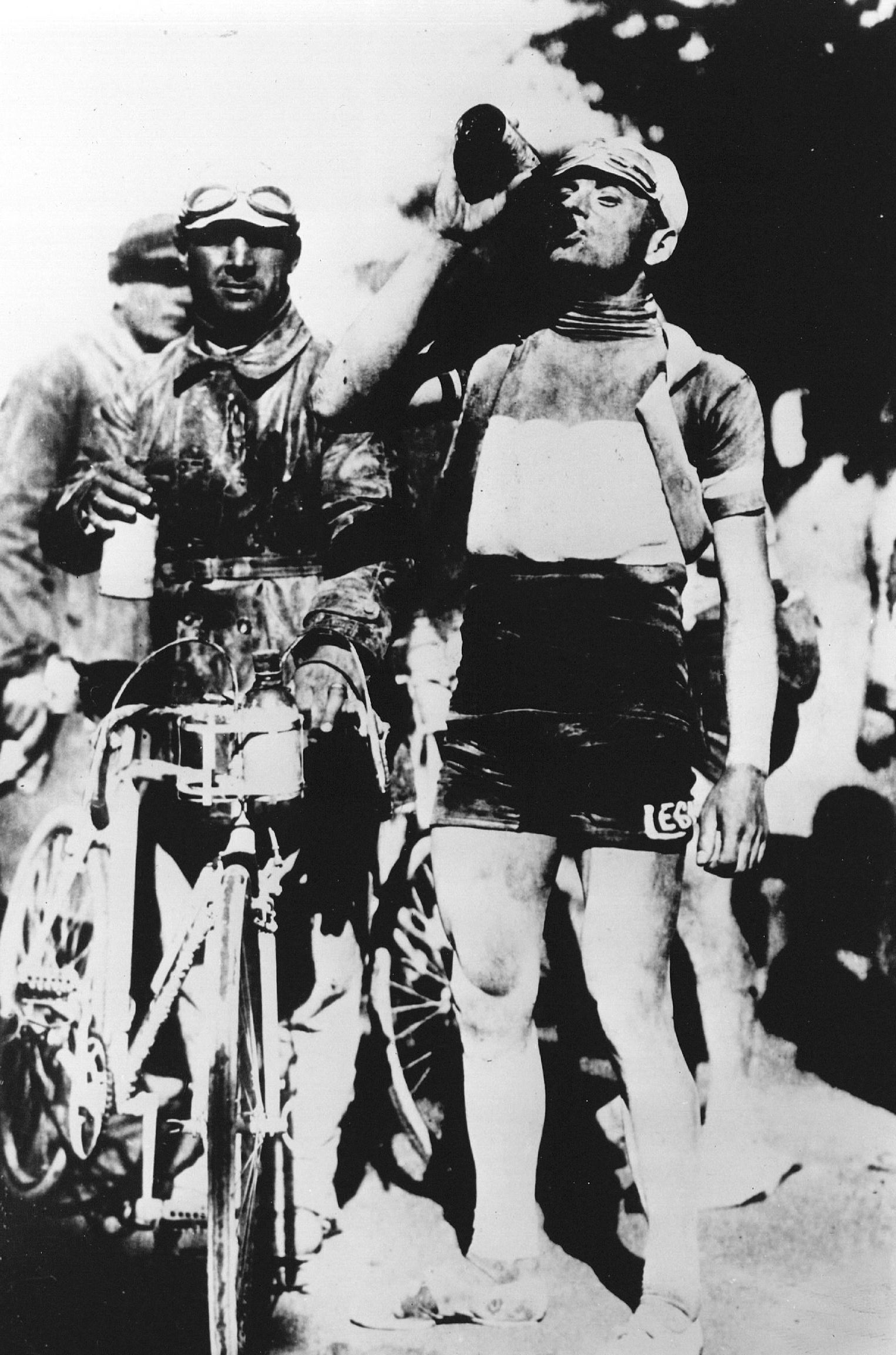
Alfredo Binda (right) was the first rider to win the Giro d'Italia five times.

The famed race general classification leader's pink jersey (Italian: maglia rosa) was introduced in 1931. The color pink was chosen for the leader's jersey because La Gazzetta dello Sport printed its news on pink paper. The maglia rosa was first worn by Learco Guerra, who won the first stage of the race. Alfredo Binda returned to the Giro after his absence the year before, but withdrew while leading during the sixth stage. The eventual winner, Francesco Camusso, attacked during the eleventh stage to claim the lead of the race. Binda came into the 1932 Giro d'Italia in poor form, so he decided to work for his teammate Antonio Pesenti. During the seventh stage of the race, Pesenti gained the lead of the race by winning the stage by means of a solo attack and went on to win the event as a whole.

The mountains classification and the individual time trial were both introduced in the 1933 Giro d'Italia. The mountains classification awarded points to the riders who crossed certain mountains on the race route first and the rider with the most points was the leader. In addition, the organizers also expanded the total number of stages to seventeen, it had been around twelve the few preceding years. Alfredo Binda gained the lead after the second stage, but lost it to Jef Demuysere after the fifth stage. After the eighth stage, Binda regained the lead and had a six-minute advantage over Demuysere. Binda won the next three stages and went on to win the race as a whole. Along with winning the general classification, Binda won the inaugural mountains classification. By winning this edition of the Giro, Binda became the first five-time winner of the Giro d'Italia.

Learco Guerra won ten of the seventeen stages that comprised the 1934 Giro d'Italia. After Alfredo Binda abandoned the race because of injuries sustained from being hit by a police motorcycle, Guerra's biggest competitor was Francesco Camusso. Camusso gained the lead after his stage thirteen performance. The race's fourteenth stage was a time trial and Camusso lost over four minutes to Guerra because of his poor performance on the day. The two riders battled all the way to Milan, but Guerra won by a margin of fifty-one seconds. The 1935 edition of the Giro saw some changes to how it was run: the organizers removed the time bonuses for winning stages and began to make use of half stages — which is when two legs are held in the same day. This race was the last time Alfredo Binda competed and the first time future great Gino Bartali participated. The eventual winner, Vasco Bergamaschi, originally came to the Giro to work for his teammate, the great Costante Girardengo. However, he gained the lead for a day after the first stage and regained it again after the sixth day of racing.

=== 1936–1953: Bartali and Coppi battle for supremacy ===
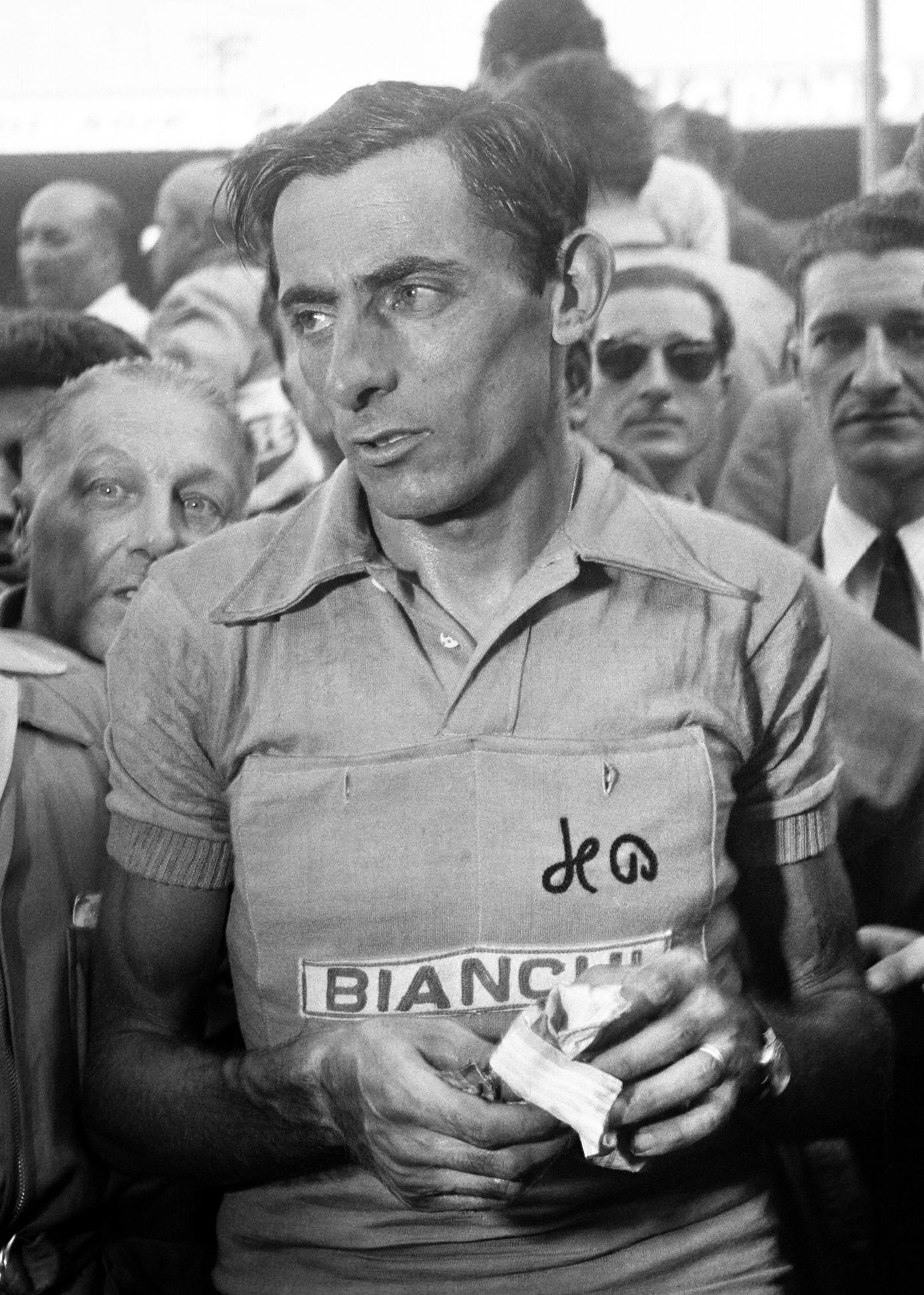
Fausto Coppi won the Giro d'Italia a record five times.

Due to Italy's political stance at the time, the 1936 Giro d'Italia saw no foreign participation. The organizers of the race included the first uphill individual time trial in the Giro's history, which travelled 20 km (12 mi) up to the summit of Monte Terminillo. Gino Bartali took the lead of the race by attacking on the final climb of the hilly ninth stage and held that lead to the event's conclusion. In addition to the general classification, Bartali won his second consecutive mountains classification title. For the 1937 Giro d'Italia the organizers decided to include the Dolomites and a team time trial for the first time. The team time trial lasted 62 km (39 mi) and was won by Legnano, the team of the eventual winner Gino Bartali. Bartali displayed his dominance in the mountains and gained the lead after the uphill stage 8a time trial. Bartali carried the pink jersey all the way to Milan and won his second consecutive Giro d'Italia.

Gino Bartali, the winner of the past two editions, was ordered by the Italian government to race the Tour de France instead of the Giro in 1938. Giovanni Valetti took the lead of the 1938 Giro d'Italia after the mountainous ninth stage. Valetti had a lead of a minute and a half after that stage and built upon that as the Giro went on, finishing almost nine minutes ahead of the second place rider Ezio Cecchi. The 1939 Giro d'Italia was a battle between Gino Bartali and Giovanni Valetti. Valetti took the lead after the stage 9b individual time trial. Bartali became the leader after he had attacked on the Passo Rolle during the fifteenth stage. Bartali lost the lead to Valetti because he crashed and had several flat tires throughout the sixteenth stage. Valetti won his second consecutive Giro d'Italia, while Bartali left the Giro with his fourth mountains classification title.

Bartali came to the 1940 Giro d'Italia with a strong Legnano team and high ambitions to win the overall crown; however his hopes were derailed when he crashed in the race's second stage and lost time. Fausto Coppi was promoted to the new team leader after Bartali's misfortunes. Coppi donned the general classification leader's pink jersey after attacking on the Abetone in the race's eleventh stage and managed to keep the lead all the way to the event's finish in Milan. Coppi became the youngest rider to ever win the Giro at 20 years, 8 months and 25 days old, breaking the record that was held by Luigi Marchisio. World War II brought the Giro's annual running to a halt after the 1940 edition.

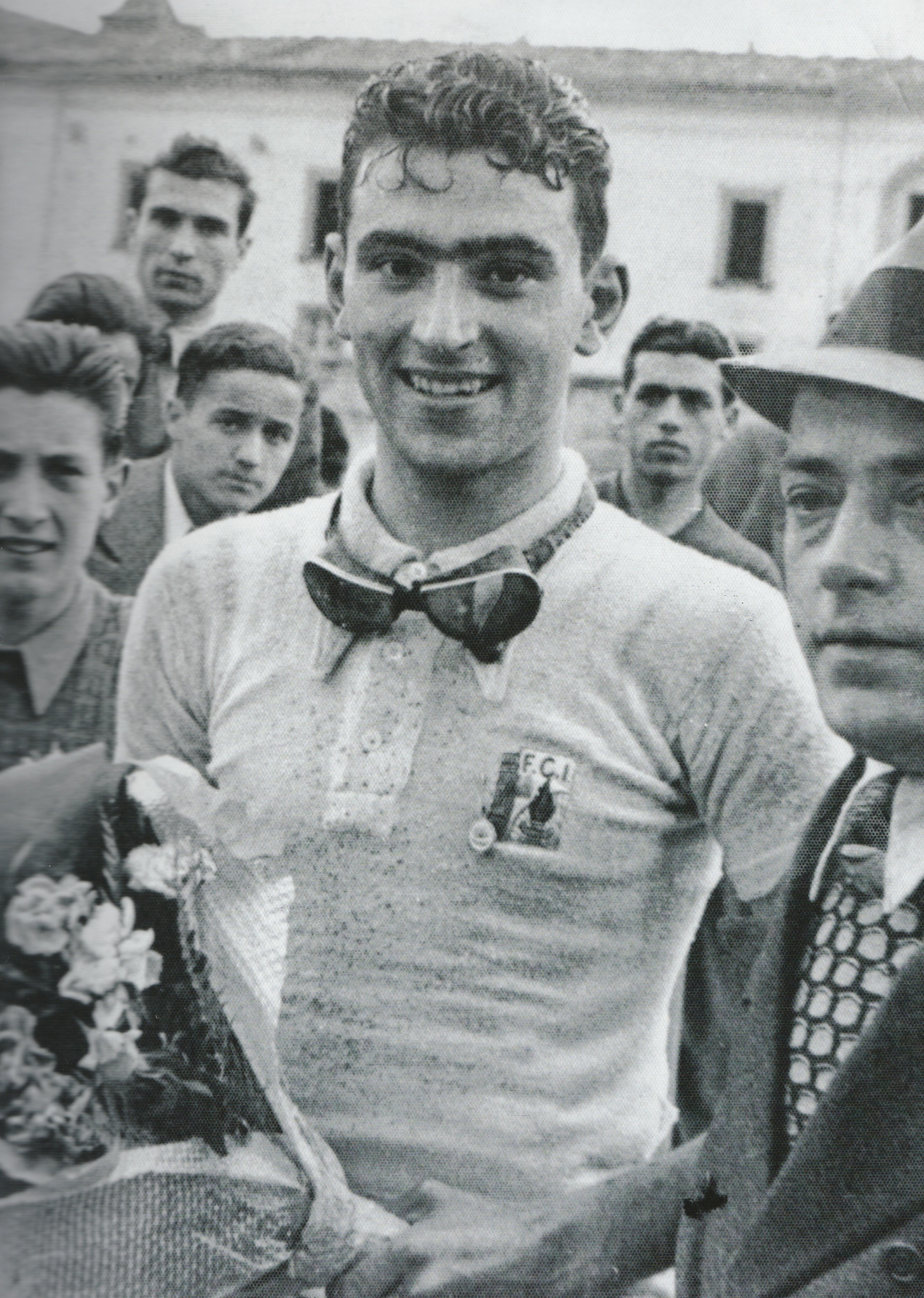
Fiorenzo Magni won the Giro d'Italia in 1948 by a margin of eleven seconds.

Benito Mussolini, Italy's dictator at the time, tried to keep the bicycle races going while Italy was involved in the Second World War. The Giro consumed so much gasoline, food, and other supplies that it would hinder Italy's efforts towards the war, so the normal Giro was not run. The government created a new "point series" Giro that was composed of the major one day races that were run in Italy, where the riders would earn points based on their placing in each race. Some of the notable races that comprised this "Giro" were the Milan–San Remo and the Giro di Lombardia. The new "point series" Giro was first won by Gino Bartali in 1942. The 1943 edition of the government's Giro was interrupted after Allie forces landed in Sicily and was subsequently Mussolini deposed. With Mussolini's reign over, bicycle racing came to a complete stop in Italy.

The Giro resumed its annual running in 1946. The organizers added the maglia nera (English: black jersey) for the last rider in the overall classification. Bartali and Coppi returned to the Giro now on separate teams. Coppi was put into difficulty in stage nine, where he lost a good deal of time. The twelfth stage was set to pass through Pieris on the way to Trieste; however, in Pieris there were some Yugoslavs who threw stones at some armed Italian guards. Gunfire erupted, the stage was cancelled, and close to twenty riders were escorted to Trieste. In addition, there were riots that took place in Trieste because both Yugoslavia and Italy claimed the city as part of their territory. Bartali gained the lead after the thirteenth stage of the race and went on to win the event without winning a stage.

The 1947 Giro d'Italia was the first Giro to have all competing riders be a part of a trade team, rather than some riders competing as independents. Fausto Coppi, Gino bartali, and Aldo Ronconi broke away during the fourth leg while climbing the Abetone and rode into Prato where Coppi won the stage and Bartali took the overall lead. Bartali held that lead until the sixteenth stage when his chain dropped on the climb of the Falzarego when Coppi saw this he attacked. On the descent of the Falzarego, the same misfortune struck Coppi, which allowed Bartali to rejoin him. Later, Coppi attacked on the Passo Pordoi and Bartali could not keep up. Coppi took the stage and the overall lead, which he held all the way to race's finish. Fiorenzo Magni won the 1948 Giro d'Italia by a margin of eleven seconds — the smallest margin of victory in the history of the race — over Ezio Cecchi. Magni gained significant time after being a part of a successful breakaway in the race's ninth day of racing. Magni's lead over race favorites Coppi and Bartali was near thirteen minutes. Cecchi briefly gained the lead of the race for two stages; however, Magni took the lead after the seventeenth stage which saw riders cross the Pordoi Pass. Coppi and his team suspected that Magni received help from the spectators, which the organizers gave Magni a two-minute penalty for. The penalty to Magni wasn't enough to prevent him from winning the race, but he did so by the slimmest of margins.

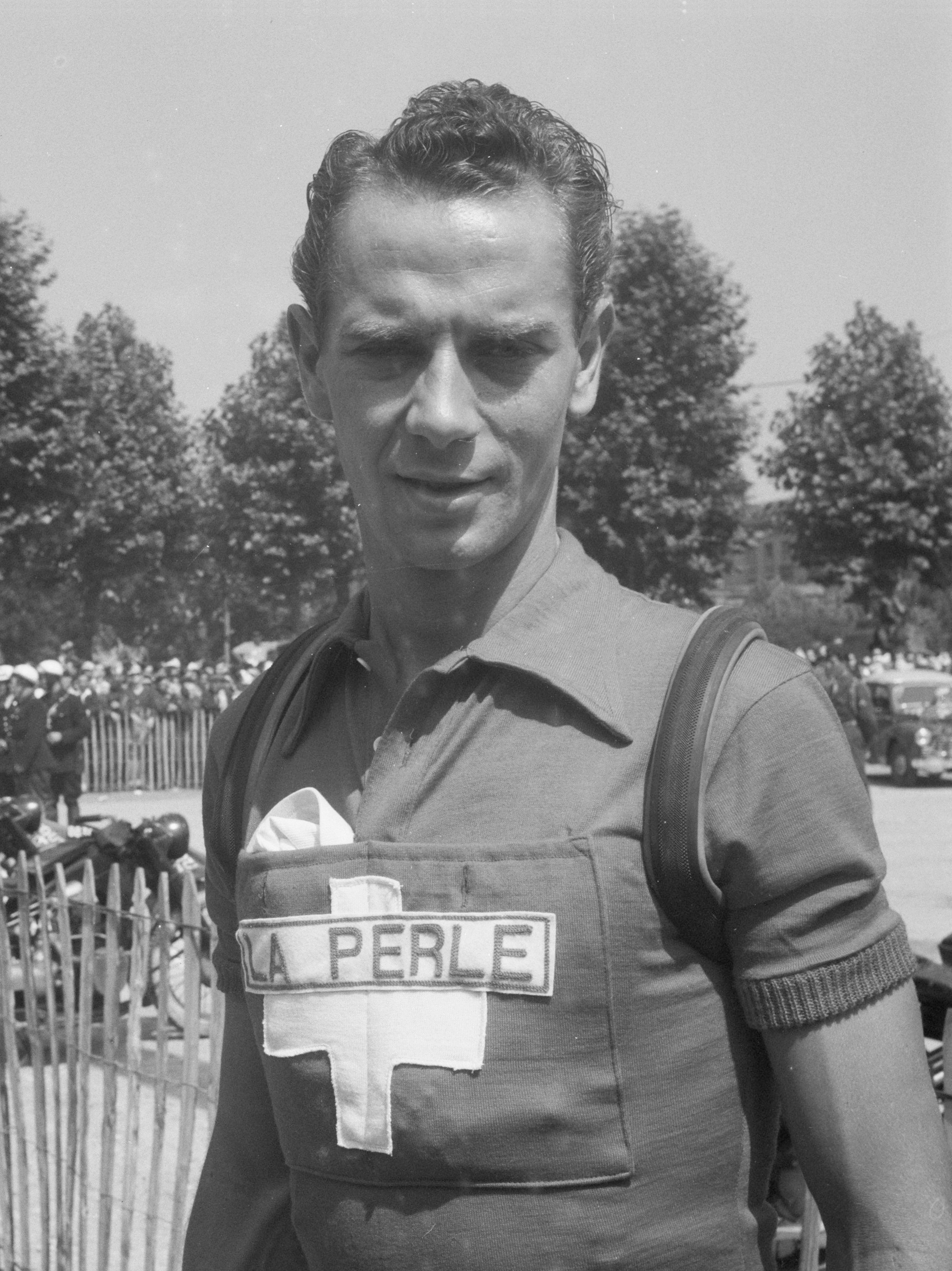
The Swiss rider Hugo Koblet was the first foreign rider to win the Giro d'Italia.

After the ninth stage of the 1949 edition, Fausto Coppi was close to ten minutes behind the race leader Adolfo Leoni in the general classification. Coppi gained over nine minutes on Leoni during the tenth stage, but Leoni remained in the lead. The race's seventeenth leg went over five major climbs before finishing in Pinerolo. Coppi attacked off the start and was the first over all the climbs and the finish line in Pinerolo; his efforts gained him the race lead and a sizable lead over his rival Gino Bartali. Coppi went on to win the Giro, his third such victory. Coppi came into the 1950 Giro d'Italia as the favorite to win the general classification; however, bad luck struck as he broke his pelvis in the race's ninth day. In the eighth leg, Hugo Koblet attacked on the Pian delle Fugazze to win the stage and gain the overall lead. Koblet kept the lead all the way to the Giro's finish in Milan and in doing so he became the first foreigner to win the Giro d'Italia. In addition, Koblet won the mountains classification.

Almost three years after his first Giro d'Italia victory, Fiorenzo Magni won the Giro d'Italia again. Magni's major rival in the 1951 edition was the Belgian Rik Van Steenbergen who performed very well in the Dolomites. Magni took the lead after descending successfully down the final climb of the eighteenth stage and then protecting the lead all way to the race's finish. The 1952 Giro d'Italia featured one of the first deaths by a rider in the Giro in Orfeo Ponsin who died from complications after crashing into a tree on the descent of the Merluzza. Fausto Coppi took the race lead upon the tenth stage's finish, but the following day he attacked on the Passo Pordoi and rode the rest of the stage by himself to increase his lead. Coppi won two stages after gaining the overall lead, which further cemented his lead in the race.

The Swiss rider Hugo Koblet gained the lead of the 1953 Giro d'Italia after the race's stage eight individual time trial. Koblet defended the successfully lead from Fausto Coppi up until the twentieth stage that contained the Stelvio Pass. The night before the twentieth stage, Koblet overused amphetamines, which made him uneasy throughout the stage. Kolbet marked an attack on the ascent of the Stelvio while showing signs of weakness. Coppi heard of Koblet's drug use and attacked. Koblet was unable to match Coppi's move and Coppi went on to win the stage and take the race lead. The time gap proved to be enough and Coppi won a record tying five Giro d'Italia.

== 1954–1967: Italian supremacy challenged ==
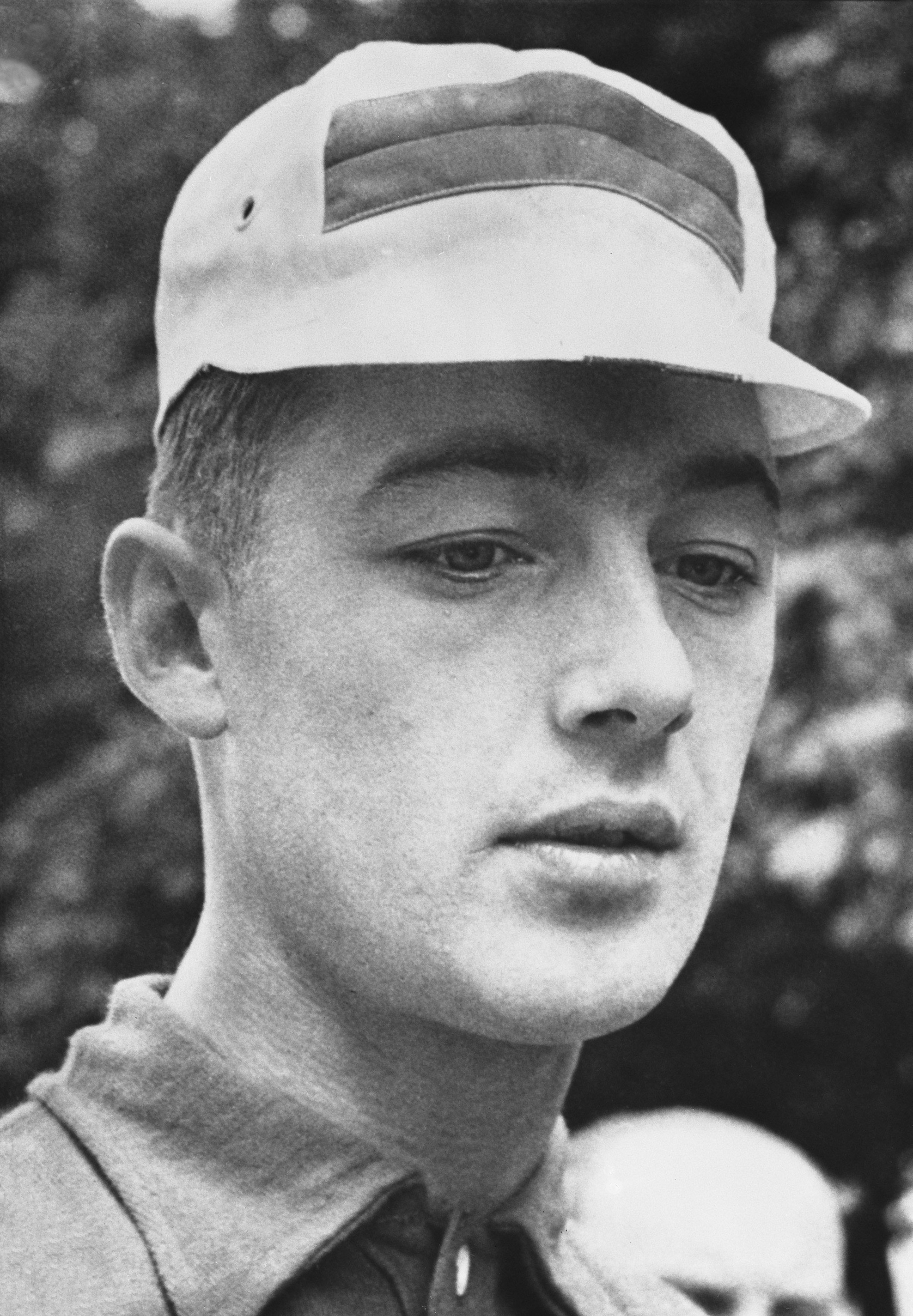
Charly Gaul won the Giro d'Italia twice in his career.

The tensions at the start of the race in 1954 were high because the organizers paid Fausto Coppi a large sum to participate in the race The transaction angered the peloton and led to the race being not highly contested; this was extremely evident on the twenty-first stage when the riders took over nine hours to complete the 222 km (138 mi) stage. Eventual winner Carlo Clerici attacked during the sixth leg and gained enough of a time advantage over the rest of the peloton and win the Giro d'Italia. Fiorenzo Magni led the majority of the first half of the 1955 Giro d'Italia before losing the lead to another rider. During the twentieth leg, Magni attacked with Fausto Coppi when his fellow competitors had stopped to change their tires. Magni's efforts gave him the race lead and ultimately his third Giro d'Italia victory.

The 1956 edition of the Giro was without much drama until the twenty-first stage that stretched from Merano to the summit finish on Monte Bondone, a mountain in the Dolomites. The stage was bitterly cold with temperatures near −10 °C (14 °F) that forced over sixty riders to abandon the race including the race leader Pasquale Fornara. Charly Gaul attacked during the stage and won the stage, while also gaining enough time to take the lead. After the Gaul crossed the stage's finish, he was taken to the hospital because his jersey was stuck to his skin. Gaul won the race and became the first Luxembourgian rider to win the Giro d'Italia. Gaul returned to the race in 1957 and regained the after the sixteenth leg. During the eighteenth stage, Gaul stopped to urinate which led his fierce rival Louison Bobet to initiate an attack with Gastone Nencini and Miguel Poblet. Gaul lost to Nencini; however, Gaul took out his frustration by aiding Nencini with his bid to win just to spite Bobet. With Gaul's help, Nencini went on to win the event by nineteen seconds over Bobet.

Italian Ercole Baldini took the lead of the 1958 Giro d'Italia after winning the mountainous, fifteenth stage to Bosco Chiesanuova. He won one more stage en route to his overall victory. The 1959 Giro d'Italia was headlined by the favorites Jacques Anquetil and Charly Gaul. Anquetil held the lead of the race going into the penultimate stage. Before the stage, Gaul stated openly that he was going to attack on the slopes of the Piccolo San Bernardo which caused Anquetil to mark him for most of the stage. Gaul stayed true to his word and attacked as the riders made their way up the Piccolo San Bernardo. Anquetil — who had eaten poorly during the stage — was unable to counter his later attacks. Gaul got away, won stage, and gained close to ten minutes on Anquetil that was sufficient to win him the event.

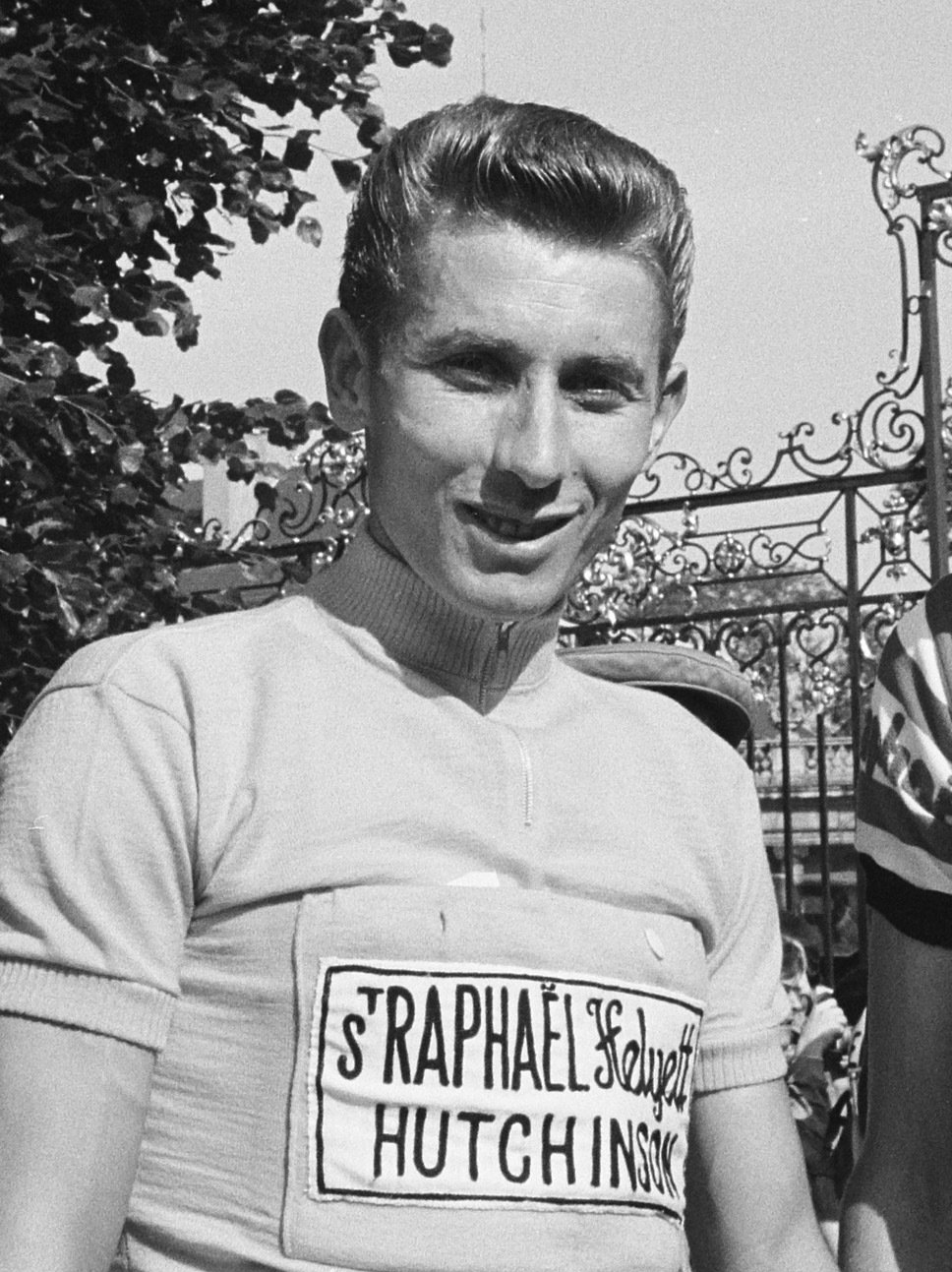
Jacques Anquetil was the first French winner of the Giro d'Italia.

Jacques Anquetil captured the lead of the 1960 Giro d'Italia after dominating the lengthy stage 14 time trial from Seregno to Lecco. Anquetil's lead shrunk because of bike issues which prevented him from countering attacks while climbing the Gavia Pass during the penultimate stage. Anquetil retained a twenty-eight second lead that proved to be enough to last to the race's finish, making him the first French winner of the Giro d'Italia. Arnaldo Pambianco captured his lone Giro victory after his efforts in a breakaway on the 1961 edition's fourteenth stage gave him the race lead.

The 1962 edition of the Giro d'Italia was marred by severe weather conditions. The fourteenth stage was shortened following a violent storm which prevented the climbing of the last two scheduled mountain passes and the stage finished atop the Passo Rolle. Angelino Soler won the race's sixteenth stage, with Franco Balmamion finishing second on the stage and taking the race lead. Balmamion successfully defended the lead all the way to the race's finish in Milan. Balmamion repeated as champion the next year after gaining the lead after the nineteenth stage that contained six difficult climbs.

Jacques Anquetil took the race lead at the 1964 Giro d'Italia after the stage five individual time trial. Despite the best attempts of Franco Balmamion and Italo Zilioli, Anquetil managed to keep his lead until the race's conclusion to win his second Giro d'Italia. The 1965 Giro d'Italia saw the introduction of the Cima Coppi — in honor of Fausto Coppi — which is the title given to the highest mountain in each Giro and gives more points towards the mountains classification than any other climb. Vittorio Adorni won the stage 13 individual time trial and gained a significant time advantage over the rest of the riders. Adorni held on to the race lead for the rest of the race and won his first Giro d'Italia.

In 1966 the points classification was introduced, which was to be awarded the most consistent high finishing riders in the peloton, specifically the sprinters. Jacques Anquetil came to the race with aspirations to win, but after losing time early on, he decided to ride for his teammate Gianni Motta. With Anquetil's help, Motta rode well through the mountains, gained the lead after the fifteenth leg, and went on to win the event as a whole. In addition, Motta also won the inaugural points classification. During the 1967 edition's twentieth stage, Felice Gimondi attacked on the slopes of the Tonale and race leader Anquetil was not able to match his move. Upon the stage's conclusion, Gimondi had gained the race lead by over three minutes. Gimondi raced into Milan the next day and won his first Giro d'Italia victory.

== 1968–1996: Foreign domination ==
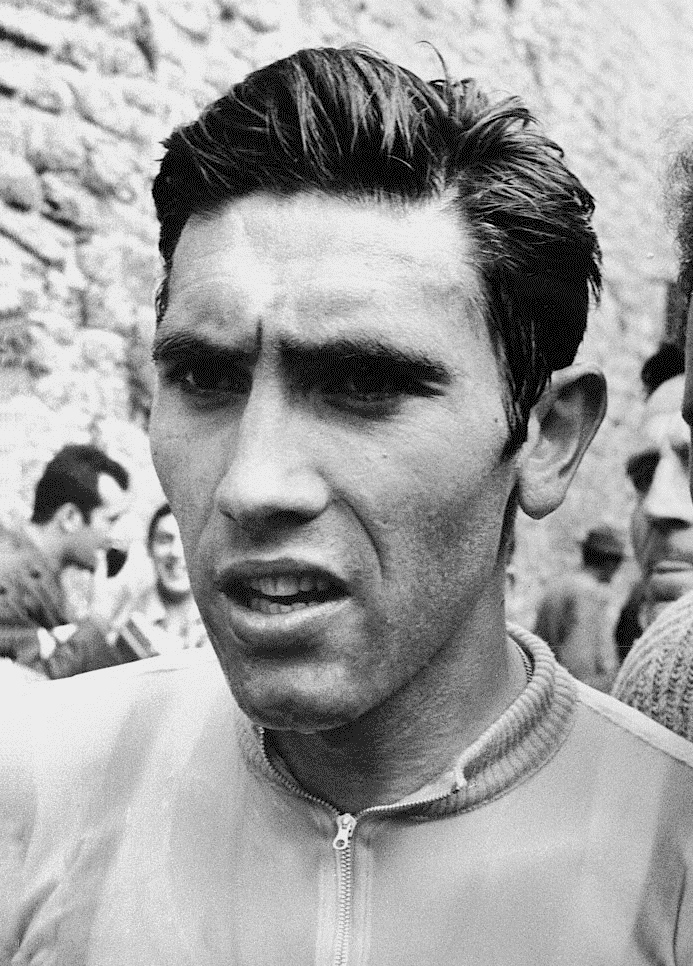
Eddy Merckx won the Giro d'Italia a record five times in his career.

The 1968 Giro d'Italia saw two important firsts: the first tests for drug use and the first prologue. A total of eight riders tested positive during the Giro. Belgian Eddy Merckx won his first Giro d'Italia after winning the twelfth stage's finish atop the Tre Cime di Lavaredo and also regaining the race lead. En route to the overall victory, Merckx won four stages. Merckx returned in 1969 and was leading the race after the sixteenth stage that ended in Savona. Merckx tested positive for a banned substance after the stage and was subsequently disqualified from the race; to this day Merckx still proclaims his innocence. Felice Gimondi took the lead after Merckx's dismissal and held it all the way to the race's conclusion.

Merckx came back the following year to liking of his sponsor. Merckx took the lead after stage five and never relinquished it; he dominated the lengthy stage nine time trial. Merckx went on to win the Tour de France and in doing so became the third rider to win two Grand Tours in a single calendar year. In 1971, reigning champion Merckx decided to ride the Critérium du Dauphiné Libéré instead. Felice Gimondi lost substantial time early on in the race to put him out of contention, while fellow Italian and teammate Gianni Motta tested positive for banned substances and was dismissed from the Giro. Swedish cyclist Gösta Pettersson gained the lead after the race's eighteenth stage and held it all the way to the finish. Pettersson became the first Swedish cyclist to win a Grand Tour.

Merckx returned to the Giro in 1972 and resumed his domination. He grabbed the lead after a long solo attack during the race's seventh stage and never let go of the lead. Merckx led the 1973 Giro d'Italia from start to finish; a feat that had not been done since Alfredo Binda did in 1927. José Manuel Fuente gained the lead early on in 1974 and held it all the way up to the Giro's fourteenth stage. Fuente had forgotten to eat properly during the fourteenth stage and suffered because of it; he lost over ten minutes to Merckx. Merckx would go on to win his fifth and final Giro d'Italia by just 12 seconds, joining the likes of Alfredo Binda and Fausto Coppi as the only five-time winners of the Giro d'Italia. Merckx success continued on into the season as he won the Tour de France and the men's road race at the World Championships and became the first rider to complete the Triple Crown of Cycling – which consists of winning two Grand Tours and the men's road race at the World Championships in one calendar year.

With the absence of Merckx from the 1975 edition due to illness, the competition increased between the other riders. Fausto Bertoglio and Francisco Galdós battled during the latter half of the race. The final stage of the race had a summit finish on the Stelvio Pass where Bertoglio fended off the attacks of Galdós to seal his overall victory. Johan de Muynck was in the lead of the 1976 Giro d'Italia when he crashed during the twentieth stage. Muynck's injuries prevented him from performing well in the next day's individual time trial. Felice Gimondi capitalized on Muynck's woes and took the lead on the final day of racing and went on to win his second Giro d'Italia. This was the last Giro that Merckx raced; he finished eighth overall.

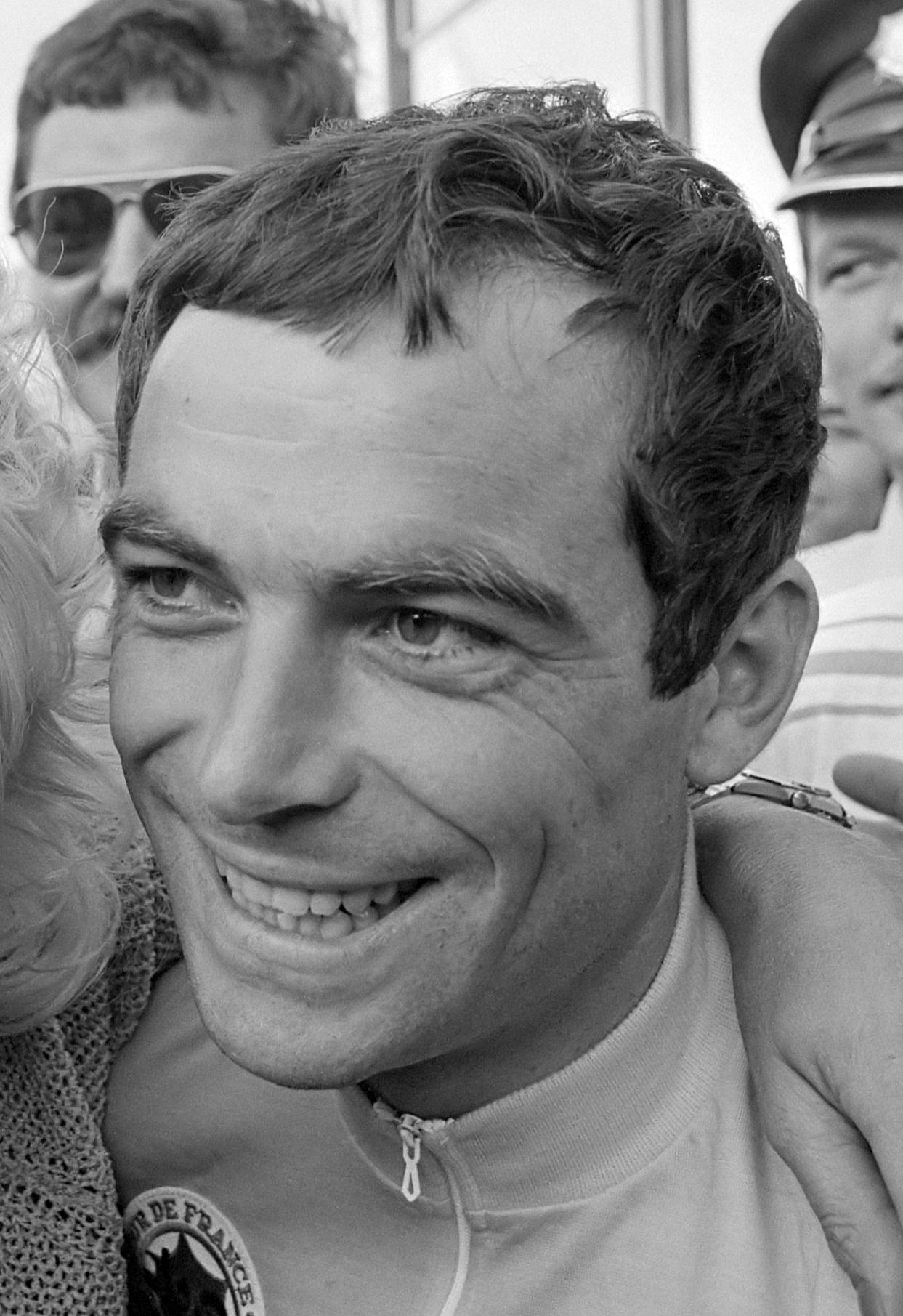
Bernard Hinault won Giro d'Italia three times in his career.

Freddy Maertens and Francesco Moser dominated the early portion of the 1977 Giro d'Italia. Belgian Michel Pollentier took the lead from Moser when the race hit the high mountains near the end of the race. Pollentier went on to win the penultimate stage en route to his lone Grand Tour victory of his career. Johan de Muynck first grabbed the lead of the 1978 Giro d'Italia after escaping during the third stage and soloing to victory. He then successfully defended his slim lead throughout the rest of the race and won the Giro. The 1979 edition featured less climbing than normal and a total of five time trials. Francesco Moser grabbed the early lead of the race after winning the first two time trials of the race. Giuseppe Saronni took the lead after the third time trial which ended in San Marino. Saronni then rode into Milan with over a two-minute lead over Moser to win the Giro.

Bernard Hinault's Giro d'Italia was in 1980. Up until the twentieth stage, the race was being dominated by the Italian competitors. During the twentieth stage, Hinault and teammate Jean-René Bernaudeau distanced themselves from the general classification contenders on the slopes of the Stelvio Pass and rode into Sondrio for the stage win. Bernaudeau won the stage, but Hinault took a sizable lead over the rest of the field – which he then held to the race's conclusion in Milan. The 1981 Giro d'Italia was hotly contested, with four riders being 30 seconds apart after twenty days of racing. Stage 20 saw the finish atop the Tre Cime di Lavaredo. Giovanni Battaglin took the lead by almost a minute over the second place rider after doing well on the climb of the Lavaredo. Battaglin won the Giro after putting in a solid performance in the race's final stage, an individual time trial.

Bernard Hinault returned to the Giro in 1982. Hinault dominated the race with stage wins in every time trial stage and stage wins atop the Campitello Matese and the Montecampione en route to the overall victory. Hinault would go on to win the Tour de France that year as well and complete the coveted Giro-Tour double. The 1983 Giro d'Italia featured few hard stages in the mountains and four time trials. The winner of the race, Giuseppe Saronni, gained the lead after the race's seventh stage that finished in Salerno. From there, Saronni won two more stages and successfully guarded his lead all the way to Milan to win his second Giro d'Italia.

The 1984 Giro d'Italia was a battle between Italian Francesco Moser and Frenchman Laurent Fignon. Moser was leading the race up until the mountainous stage twentieth stage that finished in Arabba. Fignon took the lead after riding into Arabba over two minutes ahead of Moser. Moser dashed through the course setting a blistering pace on the roads, he won the stage and the Giro due to his performance in the final stage. Bernard Hinault raced the Giro again in 1985. The race was led early on by Italian Roberto Visentini. However, after the stage twelve time trial, Hinault was in control of the race and went to win his third Giro d'Italia.

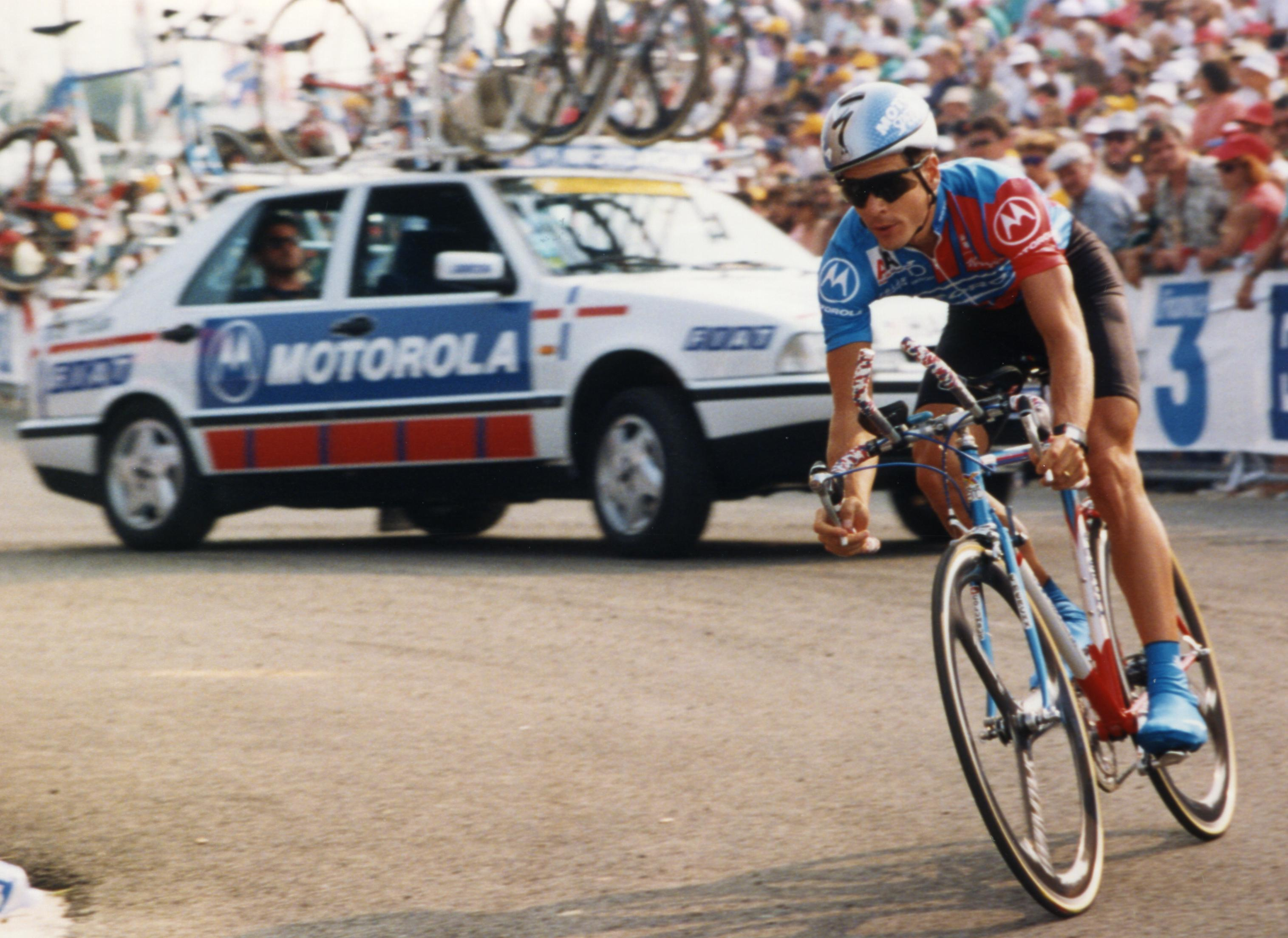
Andrew Hampsten became the first non-European to win the Giro d'Italia in 1988.

Giuseppe Saronni led the 1986 Giro d'Italia for the majority of the race before losing it to Roberto Visentini in the Alps. Visentini then fought off attacks from the challengers in the Dolomites en route to his first Giro d'Italia general classification victory. The 1987 edition was highlighted by the controversy between Carrera Jeans–Vagabond's two general classification riders Roberto Visentini and Stephen Roche. Roche led the race early on but lost the lead to Visentini after crashing during the thirteenth stage. Roche attacked on the race's mountainous fifteenth stage despite orders from Carrera team management not to. Roche took the lead and wound up winning the Giro. Roche's success would not stop there during the 1987 season, he would go on to win the Tour de France and the men's road race at the World Championships to complete the Triple Crown of Cycling.

The 1988 Giro d'Italia is remembered for the fourteenth stage that contained very poor weather throughout the stage and most notably on the slopes of the Passo di Gavia. Franco Chioccioli led the race at the start of the fabled fourteenth stage. On the slopes of the Gavia, Andrew Hampsten and Erik Breukink rode away from their fellow riders; Breukink would go on to win the stage, but Hampsten would take the overall lead. Hampsten went on to win the race and became the first non-European to win the Giro d'Italia.

Dutchman Erik Breukink gained the lead of the 1989 Giro d'Italia after winning the stage 10 individual time trial. Breukink lost the lead after the fourteenth stage that contained five major passes. The Frenchman Laurent Fignon took the lead of the race from Breukink and then held it all the way to the finish in Florence. This was also the year the intergiro classification was introduced to the Giro d'Italia – the calculation for the intergiro is similar to that of the general classification, in each stage there is a midway point that the riders pass through a point and where their time is stopped and then totaled up after each stage. Jure Pavlič was the first winner of the intergiro classification. Gianni Bugno dominated the 1990 edition after gaining the lead after the first stage. Bugno led the race from start to finish – a feat that had only been done three times before in the history of the Giro d'Italia.

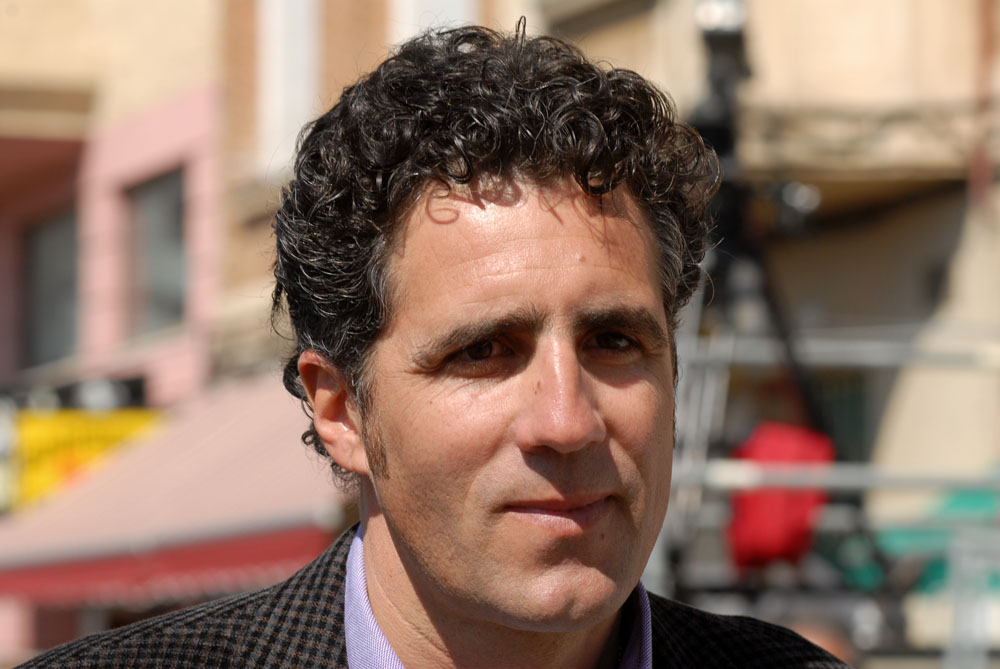
Miguel Induráin was the first Spanish rider to win the Giro d'Italia.

Franco Chioccioli reigned supreme at the 1991 Giro d'Italia. Chioccioli led the race for all but two stages. He cemented his lead and the eventual overall victory by winning the seventeenth stage that contained a summit finish on the Passo Pordoi and winning the penultimate stage which was an individual time trial. Miguel Induráin became the first Spanish rider to win the Giro d'Italia in 1992 Indurain first gained the lead of the race after the hilly third stage that led into Arrezo and then held it all the way to the finish in Milan. He separated himself from his competitors during the race's two individual time trials, both of which he won. Indurain would go on to ride the Tour de France in July and win it, and in doing so completed the rare Giro-Tour double.

Indurain returned in 1993 to defend his crown. The only rider that could compete with Indurain was the Latvian Piotr Ugrumov, who attacked Indurain repeatedly throughout the race. Indurain won two stages – both time trials – en route to his second Giro d'Italia victory. He would go on to complete the Giro-Tour double for the second consecutive year, a feat which had never been accomplished before. The 1994 Giro d'Italia saw Russian Evgeni Berzin gain the overall lead after winning the fourth stage, featuring a summit finish on Campitello Matese. Berzin consolidated his lead with victories in the race's final two time trials en route to the overall victory. In doing so he spoiled Indurain's hopes for a three peat.

Tony Rominger came to the 1995 Giro d'Italia in great form. Rominger gained the lead after the stage two time trial and never gave it up. His opposition came from the returning champion Berzin and teammate Piotr Ugrumov who attacked each other repeatedly, which greatly hurt their chances. In addition to the general classification, Rominger also won the points and intergiro classifications. The 1996 Giro d'Italia celebrated the centenary of the founding of La Gazzetta dello Sport by holding the first three stages in the Greek capital of Athens. Eventual winner Pavel Tonkov first gained the race lead after the mountainous thirteenth stage that ended in Prato Nevoso. Tonkov lost his slim lead to the Spaniard Abraham Olano for a two-stage period, before regaining it after stage 21, which contained five climbs of high severity. Tonkov rode into Milan the next day winner of the Giro d'Italia.

== 1997–2007: Italians resume conquest ==
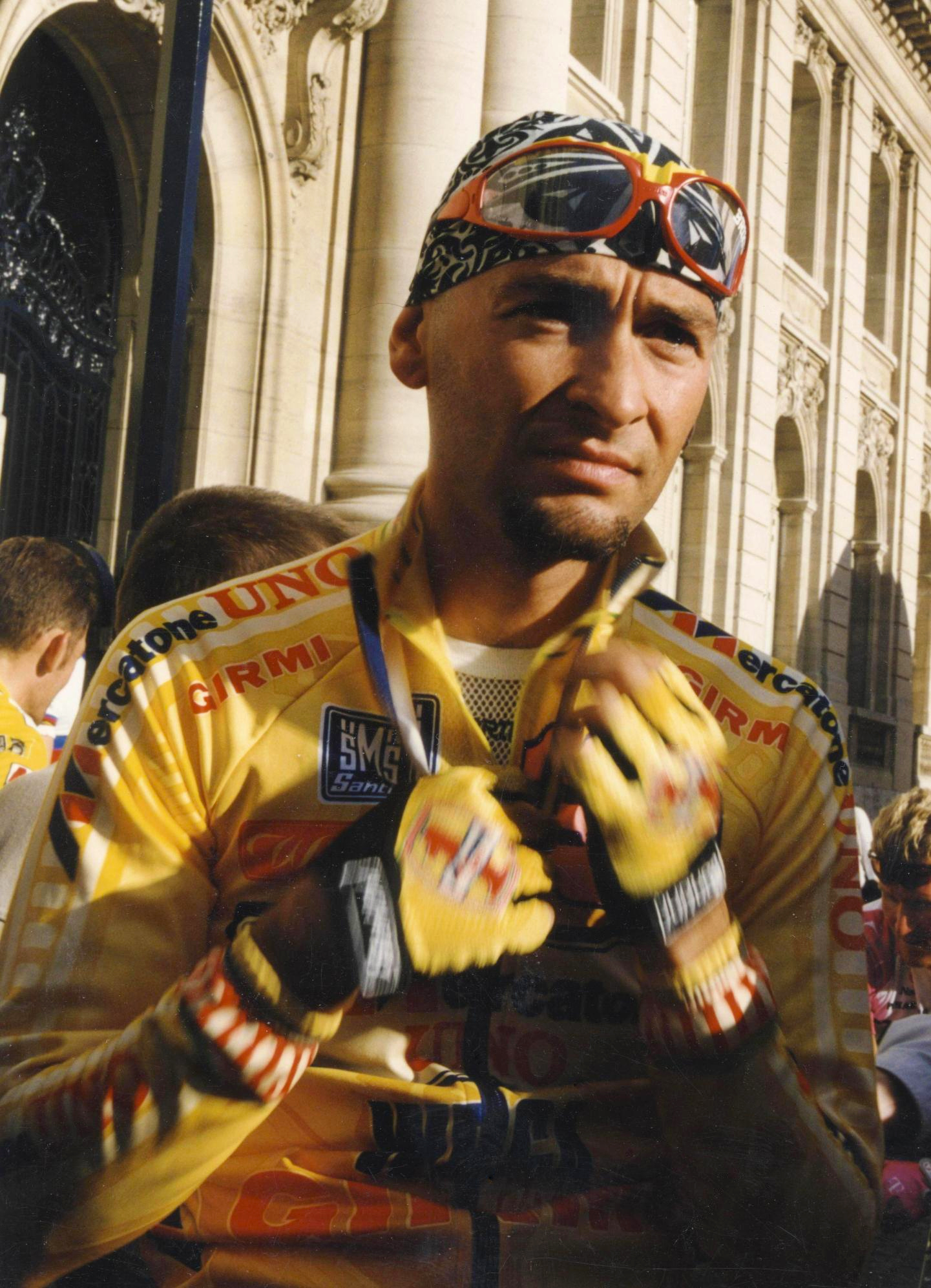
Marco Pantani completed the Giro-Tour double in 1998.

Pavel Tonkov returned to the Giro in 1997 with ambitions of repeating as winner. Tonkov first led the race after winning the stage three time trial and up until the fourteenth stage's conclusion. During the fourteenth stage, Italian Ivan Gotti attacked and soloed his way to take the stage win in Breuil-Cervinia and the race lead. Gotti extended his lead after performing well in the mountainous nineteenth stage and went on to win the Giro three days later. Swiss rider Alex Zülle was the first rider to lead the 1998 Giro d'Italia and he led for the most part of the race. Zülle was leading the race as it entered the Dolomites. Italians Giuseppe Guerini and Marco Pantani were at the head of the race during the race's mountainous seventeenth stage; the two riders worked together to get to the stage finish in Selva di Val Gardena. Guerini won the stage while Pantani took the overall lead. Pantani went on to win the Giro and subsequently the 1998 Tour de France, thus completing the rare feat of winning the Giro d'Italia and the Tour de France in the same calendar year.

Pantani returned to the Giro in 1999 while in peak physical form. Pantani gained the lead after the race's fourteenth stage and as the race hit the high mountains, he extended his lead with three stage wins. On the morning of the twentieth stage, Pantani was dismissed from the Giro after having hematocrit levels above 50%. 1997 victor Ivan Gotti, who was second place at the time, subsequently took the lead and wound up winning the Giro for the second time in his career. Francesco Casagrande took the lead in the 2000 Giro d'Italia after a long solo attack during the race's ninth stage. Fatigue set in with Casagrande as the race wore on and on the penultimate stage he lost the lead, and ultimately the Giro, to Stefano Garzelli.

Dario Frigo took the lead in the 2001 Giro d'Italia after the race's fourth stage. Frigo defended the lead until the thirteenth stage, when the race went over some major passes in the Dolomites. During the thirteenth stage, Gilberto Simoni attacked and his labor bore fruits as he took the race leader's maglia rosa when the stage was over. Frigo gained some time back in the stage fifteen time trial, but it wasn't enough to overcome Simoni's lead. Simoni went on to win the Giro d'Italia by a wide margin after Frigo's withdrawal. Stefano Garzelli took the early lead after winning the 2002 Giro d'Italia's second stage, but soon tested positive for probenecid – a banned substance – and was forced to leave the Giro. In the final major mountain stage of the race, stage seventeen, Paolo Savoldelli attacked with around nine kilometers to go in the stage and managed to take the lead and go on to win the Giro.

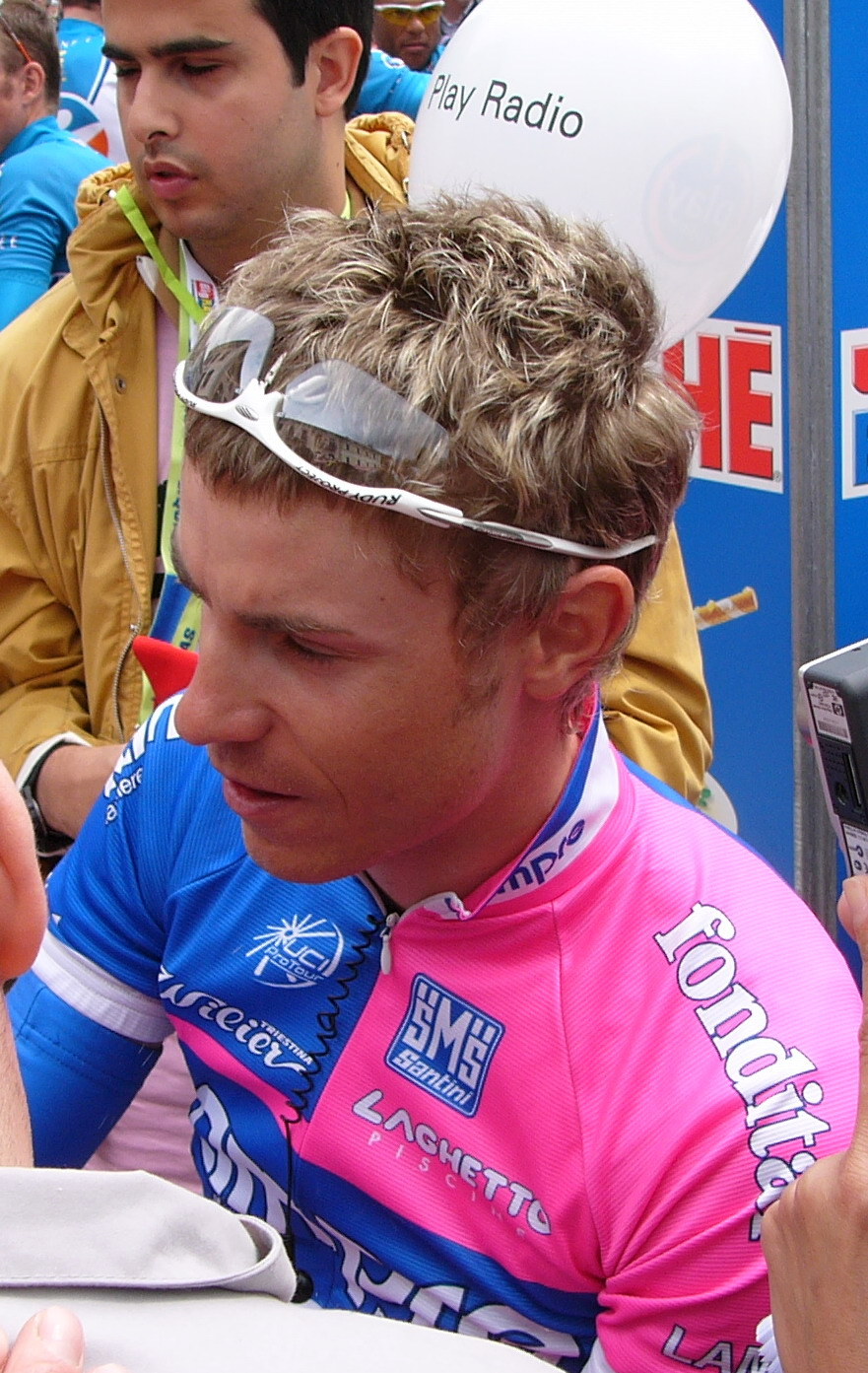
Damiano Cunego won the Giro in 2004.

Alessandro Petacchi was the first rider to lead the 2003 Giro d'Italia after winning the opening stage. Petacchi lost the lead to Stefano Garzelli after he won the stage seven summit finish on the Monte Terminillo. Garzelli then lost the lead to Gilberto Simoni after the tenth stage. Simoni went on to win the Giro after expanding his lead through stage wins on the Monte Zoncolan and the Alpe di Pampeago The 2004 Giro d'Italia saw a battle between Damiano Cunego, Serhiy Honchar, and Gilberto Simoni. Simoni gained the lead after the third stage and held it to the seventh stage where he lost it to Cunego. Cunego held the lead until the lengthy stage twelve individual time trial when Yaroslav Popovych took the lead. Cunego regained the lead after the sixteenth stage and went on to win the race, while fellow Italian Alessandro Petacchi won nine out of the 21 stages.

The 2005 Giro d'Italia saw the race lead change hands multiple times within the first week of racing. Ivan Basso gained the lead after the eleventh stage, which finished in Zoldo Alto. Two days later, Paolo Savoldelli gained the lead after the thirteenth stage that finish in Urtijëi. Savoldelli went on to win his second Giro d'Italia while fending off the attacks of Gilberto Simoni and José Rujano. Ivan Basso won the 2006 Giro d'Italia in a convincing fashion. Basso gained the lead after winning the race's eighth stage that featured a summit finish on the Passo Lanciano. He won two more stages after taking the lead of the race en route to his overall victory.

The race leader's pink jersey changed hands five times in the first week of racing in the 2007 Giro d'Italia. Andrea Noè took the lead away from Marco Pinotti after the race's tenth stage. Noè lost the lead to Danilo Di Luca after he won the twelfth stage into Briançon. Di Luca was not seriously challenged after taking the race lead in stage 12, and comfortably won the Giro in Milan with a two-minute gap over Schleck in second.

== 2008–2019: International Firsts ==
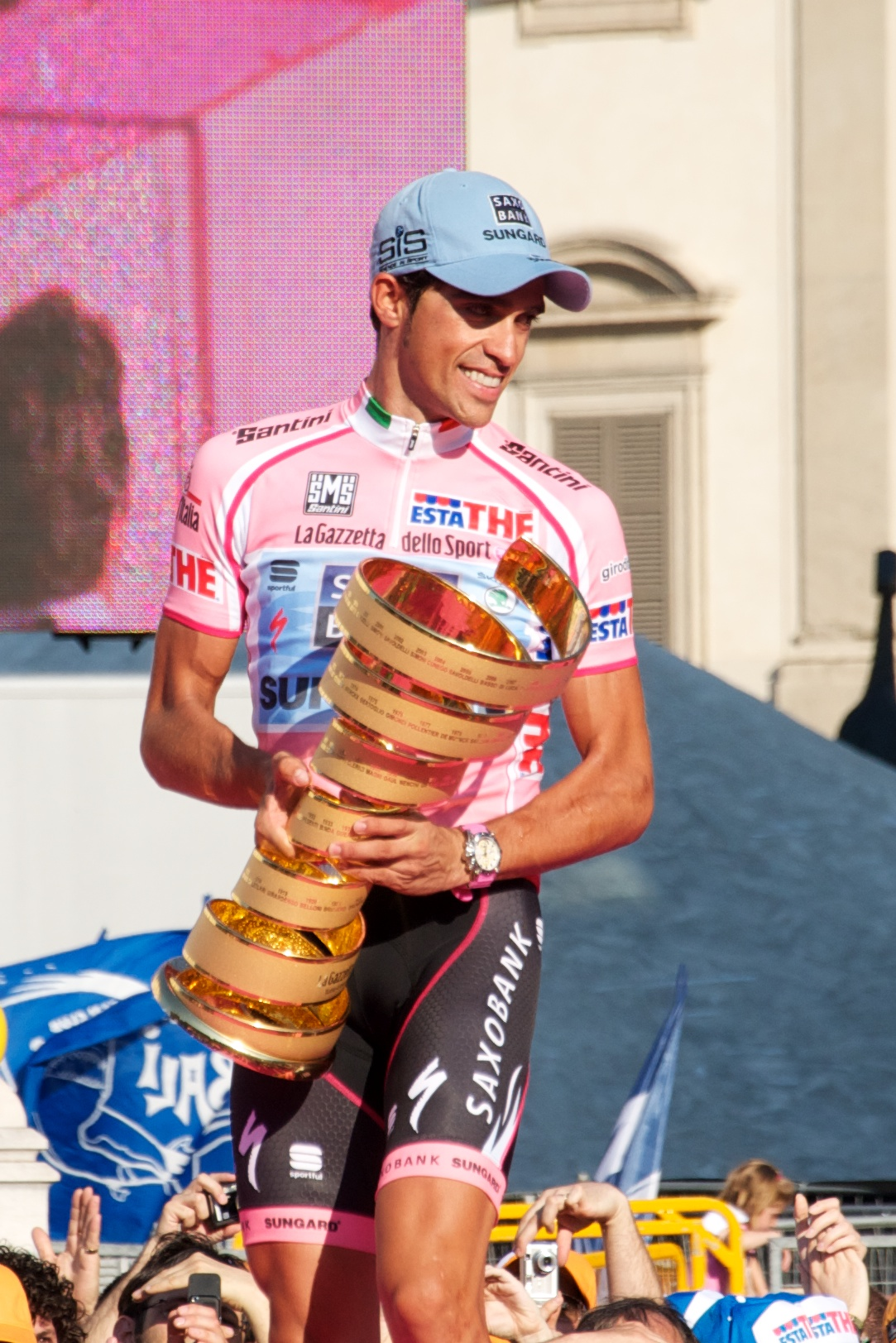
Alberto Contador won the 2011 Giro d'Italia before being stripped of his title after being found guilty of taking banned substances.

The 2008 Giro d'Italia was led for many days by Giovanni Visconti who had gained the lead after participating in a breakaway. Eventual winner Alberto Contador first took the lead of the race after the second mountain stage, to Marmolada, by finishing nearly fifteen minutes ahead of previous race leader Gabriele Bosisio – who had just gained the lead the stage before. In the race's final week, Contador faced stern challenges from Riccò and defending Giro champion Danilo Di Luca; however, their efforts bore no fruits as Contador went on to win the race. Russian Denis Menchov won the 2009 centennial edition of the Giro, after having taken the lead in a long time trial in stage 12, and defended it vigorously against attacks from his closest challenger, Danilo Di Luca, during the mountain stages of the final week. Di Luca came in second, 41 seconds behind the winner, and won the points classification. Subsequent to the Giro, both he and third-place finisher Franco Pellizotti became embroiled in doping scandals, were given bans, and had their results stripped.

The 2010 Giro d'Italia saw the lead change hands eight times during the race. Spanish rider David Arroyo was leading the race as it headed into the final mountain stages of the race. Arroyo lost the race lead to Ivan Basso after the nineteenth stage where he lost over three minutes to Basso. Basso fended off attacks and performed adequately in the final time trial to secure his second Giro d'Italia victory. Alberto Contador returned to the Giro in 2011 and was seen as the favorite for the overall victory on what many saw as a very difficult course.

On stage 3 of the 2011 Giro d' Italia, Wouter Weylandt had a fatal crash. The next stage was neutralized, with his Leopard Trek team and friend Tyler Farrar allowed to pass the finish line first.

Contador assumed the race lead after winning the ninth stage to Mount Etna. Contador continued to increase his advantage by riding well in the remaining stages and winning the stage 16 individual time trial, which allowed him to win his second Giro d'Italia championship. Contador raced the 2011 Giro despite having an ongoing trial about his possible use of clenbuterol, a banned substance. On 6 February 2012 the Court of Arbitration for Sport decided that Contador should lose his 2010 Tour de France title and his results since that race, which included his Giro victory in May 2011, and receive a two-year ban. After Contador's conviction, runner up Michele Scarponi was then delegated the overall victory.

The 2012 Giro d'Italia saw a battle between Canadian Ryder Hesjedal and Spaniard Joaquim Rodríguez. Hesjedal first took the lead after finishing well on the seventh stage that featured a summit finish to Rocca di Cambio. Rodríguez snagged a narrow lead over Hesjedal after winning the tenth stage into Assisi. Hesjedal regained the lead after the mountainous fourteenth stage; however, Rodríguez took it back the next day. Rodríguez held that lead all the way to the final stage, which he came into with a 31-second buffer over Hesjedal. Hesjedal rode and manage to finish with a time 47 seconds better than Rodríguez, giving him the overall victory in the Giro. This made him the first rider from Canada to win a grand tour and the second North American, after Andy Hampsten in 1988, to win the Giro. In 2013 Vincenzo Nibali took the lead after the race's eighth stage. Nibali would go on to win the race after he expanded his lead through performing well in the early mountain stages and winning both the stage 18 individual time trial and the penultimate stage of the race. 2014 saw the first ever Colombian grand tour winner, and Giro d'Italia winner from South America in Nairo Quintana.

Tom Dumoulin won the 100th Giro in 2017, the first time ever that a Dutch cyclist won the Giro. He was also the first Dutchman to win the overall in a Grand Tour since Joop Zoetemelk won the 1980 Tour de France. A year later, Chris Froome won the 2018 Giro, becoming the first British rider to win the overall race. The 2019 Giro d'Italia champion was Richard Carapaz, who became the first Ecuadorian to win the Giro.

== 2020–2022: Recent years ==
The 2020 Giro d'Italia was due to start in Hungary for the first three stages, the first Grand Tour stages to take place in that country, but was postponed due to the COVID-19 pandemic. As a result, 2020 marked the first time in the race's history that it was held in October instead of May or June. This edition ended up as a slugfest, because in the last four days of the race four different riders wore the Maglia Rosa in João Almeida, Wilco Kelderman and Jai Hindley before Tao Geoghegan Hart won the race on the final time trial. The 2021 edition was won by Egan Bernal who dominated the race for the most part with only underdog and career long Domestique Damiano Caruso finishing inside +2:00 of him. The 2022 Giro d'Italia saw a battle between Richard Carapaz and Jai Hindley in which Hindley took over the lead on the final mountain stage and defended it in the final time trial becoming the second Australian to win a grand tour and the first to win the Giro.

== Bibliography ==
- Foot, John (2011). "The Heroic Age". Pedalare! Pedalare!. Bloomsbury Publishing. ISBN 978-1-4088-1755-1.
- Fotheringham, William (2003). "The Heroic Age". Century of Cycling: The Classic Races and Legendary Champions. MBI Publishing Company. ISBN 978-0-7603-1553-8.
