= 1926 Giro d'Italia =

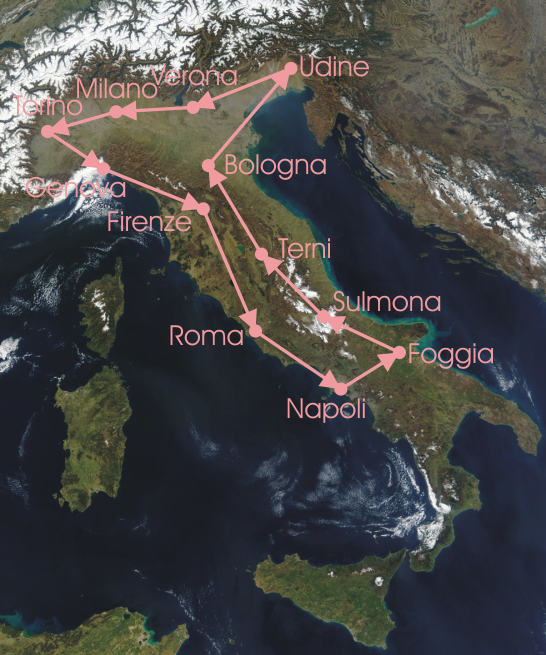
- Race Route

Race details
- Dates: 15 May – 6 June 1926
- Stages: 12
- Distance: 3,249.7 km (2,019 mi)
- Winning time: 137h 55' 59"

Results
	Winner	Giovanni Brunero (ITA)	(Legnano)
	Second	Alfredo Binda (ITA)	(Legnano)
	Third	Arturo Bresciani (ITA)	(Bianchi)

The 1926 Giro d'Italia was the 14th edition of the Giro d'Italia, a Grand Tour organized and sponsored by the newspaper La Gazzetta dello Sport. The race began on 15 May in Milan with a stage that stretched 275 km (171 mi) to Turin, finishing back in Milan on 6 June after a 288 km (179 mi) stage and a total distance covered of 3,249.7 km (2,019 mi). The race was won by the Giovanni Brunero of the Legnano team. Second and third respectively were the Italian riders Alfredo Binda and Arturo Bresciani.

== Participants ==
In the two previous editions, a conflict between cycling teams and the Giro organisation had the effect that all riders rode as individuals, and that some teams kept their riders away from these Giros. In 1926, this conflict had been resolved and the teams were back, but they had to allow the Giro to increaes the number of participants considerably.

Of the 206 riders that began the Giro d'Italia on 15 May, 40 of them made it to the finish in Milan on 6 June. Riders were allowed to ride on their own or as a member of a team. There were six teams that competed in the race: Berrenttini, Ganna, Legnano, Météore, Olympia, and Wolsit. Eighteen of the 206 riders were on a team.

The peloton was primarily composed of Italians. The field featured two former Giro d'Italia champions in two-time winners Costante Girardengo and Giovanni Brunero, 1924 winner Giuseppe Enrici, and returning champion Alfredo Binda. Other notable Italian riders that started the race included Giovanni Rossignoli and Angelo Gremo.

== Race summary ==
In the first stage, Binda crashed. A mechanical failure costed him a lot of time, and he finished more than twenty minutes behind his rival Girardengo.

That first stage was won by Piemontesi, who also won the second stage. Piemontesi had a firm lead in the general classification.

Binda won back some time by winning the third stage, but he was still far behind in the general classification. His team mate Brunero was doing much better, and Binda decided to ride in support of Brunero. In the fourth stage, Binda and Brunero escaped together with Girardengo; all other riders lost over ten minutes to them. Girardengo became the new leader, with Brunero close behind him.

In the fifth and the sixth stage the three riders finished in front of the field; Girardengo won the fifth stage, and Binda won the sixth. Thus, Girardengo led after the sixth stage. In the subsequent rest day, he became sick. He started the seventh stage, but had to abandon in the first half. Binda and Brunero rode away from the other riders, and won with a margin of more than 25 minutes. Brunero became the new leader of the general classification; Binda was in third place, and would have been leading if the time loss in the first stage would not have happened.

Brunero did not get into problems in the final stages, and neither did Binda; Binda won three more stages, and jumped to second place in the general classification when Bresciani lost time. Therefore Brunero became the winnre of the 1926 Giro, with his team mate Binda in second place.

== Final standings ==
=== Stage results ===
Stage results
Stage	Date	Course	Distance	Type (Note: In 1926, there was no distinction in the rules between plain stages and mountain stages; the icons shown here indicate that the first, third, fourth, sixth, seventh, eighth, eleventh, and twelfth stages included major mountains.)	Winner	Race Leader
1	15 May	Milan to Turin	275 km (171 mi)	Stage with mountain(s)	Domenico Piemontesi (ITA)	Domenico Piemontesi (ITA)
2	17 May	Turin to Genoa	250.5 km (156 mi)	Plain stage	Domenico Piemontesi (ITA)	Domenico Piemontesi (ITA)
3	19 May	Genoa to Florence	312 km (194 mi)	Stage with mountain(s)	Alfredo Binda (ITA)	Domenico Piemontesi (ITA)
4	21 May	Florence to Rome	287.2 km (178 mi)	Stage with mountain(s)	Costante Girardengo (ITA)	Costante Girardengo (ITA)
5	23 May	Rome to Naples	232.1 km (144 mi)	Plain stage	Costante Girardengo (ITA)	Costante Girardengo (ITA)
6	25 May	Naples to Foggia	262.9 km (163 mi)	Stage with mountain(s)	Alfredo Binda (ITA)	Costante Girardengo (ITA)
7	27 May	Foggia to Sulmona	250.8 km (156 mi)	Stage with mountain(s)	Alfredo Binda (ITA)	Giovanni Brunero (ITA)
8	29 May	Sulmona to Terni	266.5 km (166 mi)	Stage with mountain(s)	Giovanni Brunero (ITA)	Giovanni Brunero (ITA)
9	31 May	Terni to Bologna	357.8 km (222 mi)	Plain stage	Alfredo Binda (ITA)	Giovanni Brunero (ITA)
10	2 June	Bologna to Udine	355.2 km (221 mi)	Plain stage	Pierino Bestetti (ITA)	Giovanni Brunero (ITA)
11	4 June	Udine to Verona	291.7 km (181 mi)	Stage with mountain(s)	Alfredo Binda (ITA)	Giovanni Brunero (ITA)
12	6 June	Verona to Milan	288 km (179 mi)	Stage with mountain(s)	Alfredo Binda (ITA)	Giovanni Brunero (ITA)
	Total		3,429.7 km (2,131 mi)			

=== General classification ===
There were 40 cyclists who had completed all twelve stages. For these cyclists, the times they had needed in each stage was added up for the general classification. For the first time, there was a time bonus for stage winners: the winner of a stage had 1:30 subtracted from their time. The cyclist with the least accumulated time was the winner. Giuseppe Enrici won the prize for best ranked independent rider in the general classification.

Final general classification (1–10)
Rank	Name	Team	Time
1	Giovanni Brunero (ITA)	Legnano	137h 55' 59"
2	Alfredo Binda (ITA)	Legnano	+ 15' 28"
3	Arturo Bresciani (ITA)	Olympia	+ 54' 41"
4	Ermanno Vallazza (ITA)	Legnano	+ 1h 11' 38"
5	Giuseppe Enrici (ITA)	—	+ 1h 15' 57"
6	Pierino Bestetti (ITA)	Wolsit	+ 1h 26' 00"
7	Gianbattista Gilli (ITA)	Olympia	+ 2h 02' 52"
8	Angelo Gremo (ITA)	Météore	+ 3h 16' 58"
9	Michele Robotti (ITA)	Berrettini	+ 3h 41' 39"
10	Ezio Cortesia (ITA)	Ganna	+ 3h 59' 18"

Final general classification (11–40)
Rank	Name	Team	Time
11	Romolo Lazzaretti (ITA)	Olympia-Dunlop	+ 4h 47' 39"
12	Giuseppe Pancera (ITA)	Olympia-Dunlop	+ 4h 58' 19"
13	Gino Balestieri (ITA)	—	+ 5h 24' 11"
14	Antonio Montevecchi (ITA)	—	+ 6h 32' 50"
15	Umberto Berni (ITA)	—	+ 6h 39' 28"
16	Umberto Brivio (ITA)	—	+ 7h 04' 034"
17	Giovanni Rossignoli (ITA)	—	+ 7h 25' 00"
18	Antonio Tecchio (ITA)	—	+ 8h 11' 20"
19	Giuseppe Casadio (ITA)	—	+ 8h 34' 21"
20	Marco Persichetti (ITA)	—	?
21	Cesare Barbera (ITA)	—	+ 9h 51' 36"
22	Arnaldo Bergami (ITA)	—	+ 10h 42' 45"
23	Virgilio Beolchi (ITA)	—	+ 10h 53' 49"
24	Angelo Cerro (ITA)	—	+ 13h 11' 25"
25	Eliseo Pancera (ITA)	—	+ 13h 49' 42"
26	Alessandro Cattaneo (ITA)	—	+ 15h 04' 33"
27	Azeglio Terreni (ITA)	—	+ 15h 18' 16"
28	Antonio Venturi (ITA)	—	+ 15h 19' 50"
29	Mosé Arosio (ITA)	—	+ 15h 27' 27"
30	Alessandro Orioli (ITA)	—	+ 15h 31' 04"
31	Augusto Rho (ITA)	—	+ 16h 21' 06"
32	Emanuele Caly (ITA)	—	+ 17h 02' 08"
33	Pietro Barbati (ITA)	—	+ 17h 26' 33"
34	Americo Giammei (ITA)	—	+ 17h 49' 07"
35	Giuseppe Pedrali (ITA)	—	+ 19h 15' 39"
36	Eustacchio Paliotta (ITA)	—	+ 19h 40' 33"
37	Giuseppe Cattaneo (ITA)	—	+ 20h 04' 07"
38	Biaggio Gavinelli (ITA)	—	+ 22h 20' 32"
39	Giacomo Fassio (ITA)	—	+ 22h 45' 07"
40	Giuseppe Chiesa (ITA)	—	+ 27h 26' 56"
