= 1924 Giro d'Italia =

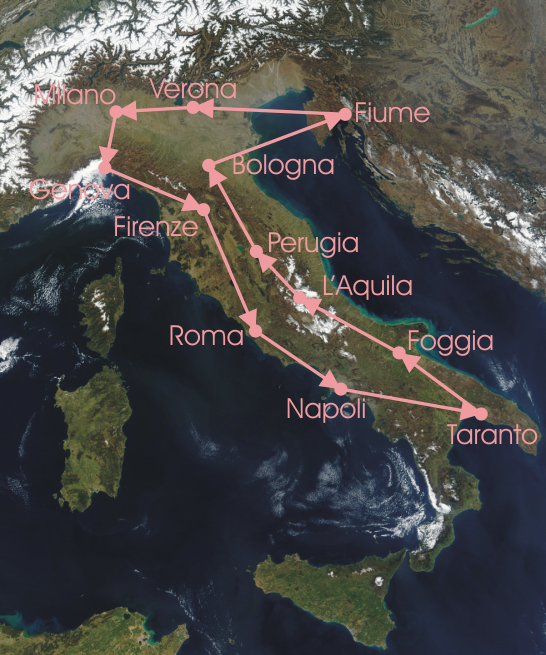
- Route of the 12th Giro d'Italia, run anti-clockwise from Milan to Milan, and entering Fiume in the Free State of Fiume (now Croatia).

Race details
- Dates: 10 May - 1 June 1924
- Stages: 12
- Distance: 3,613 km (2,245 mi)
- Winning time: 143h 43' 37"

Results
	Winner	Giuseppe Enrici (ITA)
	Second	Federico Gay (ITA)
	Third	Angiolo Gabrielli (ITA)

The 1924 Giro d'Italia was the 12th edition of the Giro d'Italia, a Grand Tour organized and sponsored by the newspaper La Gazzetta dello Sport. The race began on 10 May in Milan with a stage that stretched 300.3 km (187 mi) to Genoa, finishing back in Milan on 1 June after a 313 km (194 mi) stage and a total distance covered of 3,613 km (2,245 mi). The race was won by the Italian rider Giuseppe Enrici. Second and third respectively were the Italian riders Federico Gay and Angiolo Gabrielli.

The 'start list' was reduced because of a strike, so the organiser Gazzetta dello Sport allowed independent riders to enter without support teams, as they provided bed, board and massage. The event was unique because of the participation of Alfonsina Strada, the only female competitor in the history of the Giro. Entry number 72 was granted to Alfonsin Strada to conceal her gender. She successfully completed the first 7 stages but a series of crashes and punctures between L'Aquila and Perugia led to her exclusion (such was her heroism that the organisers allowed her to continue each stage without inclusion in the overall classification). Her final time was 20 hours behind of the first classified in Milan.

== Participants ==
The peloton was completely composed of Italians for the second consecutive year. Notable riders that started the race included Giuseppe Enrici, Federico Gay and Bartolomeo Aymo. Former winners Costante Girardengo and Giovanni Brunero, along with Ottavio Bottecchia, Gaetano Belloni, and other top riders chose not participate in the race due to disagreements over appearance fees with the organizers. In order to get the appropriate number of riders, the organizers offered room and board, along with food, for all those who entered. The riders were all considered to be independent as many riders were in disagreement with their teams over money. Of the 90 riders that began the Giro d'Italia on 10 May, 30 of them made it to the finish in Milan on 1 June.

The 1924 edition of the race saw the first and only ever woman participate. Alfonsina Strada entered the race as "Alfonsin Strada" to conceal her gender. She previously raced against men in the Giro di Lombardia in 1917 and 1918. She was widely regarded as the best female cyclist in Italy at the time. Her identity was uncovered and made public by La Gazzetta dello Sport on 14 May when they published the headline "Alfonsina e la bici." Strada completed the first seven stages, but finished outside the time limit on the eighth stage where she fell several times and arrived in Perugia fifteen hours after starting. The organizers, however, asked her to continue riding to the race's finish because of the heightened interest in the race due to a woman participating in a men's event.

== Race summary ==
Aymo won the first stage, ten minutes ahead of Federico Gay. Gay won the second stage, but because Aymo was only seven minutes behind he stayed in the lead.

In the third stage, Aymo suffered on the final climb. When he reached the top, he was far behind the rest, and decided to abandon the race. Gay won the stage, and became the new leader, almost fifteen minutes ahead of Giuseppe Enrici.

Not much changed until the seventh stage. In that stage, Gay attacked on the Macerone, but had overestimated his climbing abilities, and was overtaken by better climbers, including Enrici. Enrici won the stage, and Gay lost seventeen minutes. Enrici was now the new leader, more than a minute ahead of Gay. All other riders were more than one hour behind, so the battle would be between Gay and Enrici.

In the eighth stage, Enrici decided the race. The weather was bad, and Gay was not able to follow Enrici. Enrici won the stage, forty minutes ahead of Gay, and his victory seemed all but secured.

During the final stages, Enrici suffered from an infected foot. He had troubles to walk, but could ride his bicycle. He finished the remaining stages in the bunch at the same time as Gay, and thus became winner of the 1924 Giro.

== Final standings ==
=== Stage results ===
The tenth stage finished in Fiume, currently in Slovenia; during the 1924 Giro it was part of Italy.

Stage results
Stage	Date	Course	Distance	Type (Note: In 1924, there was no distinction in the rules between plain stages and mountain stages; the icons shown here indicate that the first, third, fifth, seventh, eighth, ninth, tenth, and twelfth stages included major mountains.)	Winner	Race Leader
1	10 May	Milan to Genoa	300.3 km (187 mi)	Stage with mountain(s)	Bartolomeo Aymo (ITA)	Bartolomeo Aymo (ITA)
2	12 May	Genoa to Florence	307.9 km (191 mi)	Plain stage	Federico Gay (ITA)	Bartolomeo Aymo (ITA)
3	14 May	Florence to Rome	284.4 km (177 mi)	Stage with mountain(s)	Federico Gay (ITA)	Federico Gay (ITA)
4	16 May	Rome to Naples	249.3 km (155 mi)	Plain stage	Adriano Zanaga (ITA)	Federico Gay (ITA)
5	18 May	Potenza to Taranto	265.3 km (165 mi)	Stage with mountain(s)	Federico Gay (ITA)	Federico Gay (ITA)
6	20 May	Taranto to Foggia	230.3 km (143 mi)	Plain stage	Federico Gay (ITA)	Federico Gay (ITA)
7	22 May	Foggia to L'Aquila	304.3 km (189 mi)	Stage with mountain(s)	Giuseppe Enrici (ITA)	Giuseppe Enrici (ITA)
8	24 May	L'Aquila to Perugia	296 km (184 mi)	Stage with mountain(s)	Giuseppe Enrici (ITA)	Giuseppe Enrici (ITA)
9	26 May	Perugia to Bologna	280.7 km (174 mi)	Stage with mountain(s)	Arturo Ferrario (ITA)	Giuseppe Enrici (ITA)
10	28 May	Bologna to Fiume	415 km (258 mi)	Stage with mountain(s)	Romolo Lazzaretti (ITA)	Giuseppe Enrici (ITA)
11	30 May	Fiume to Verona	366.5 km (228 mi)	Plain stage	Arturo Ferrario (ITA)	Giuseppe Enrici (ITA)
12	1 June	Verona to Milan	313 km (194 mi)	Stage with mountain(s)	Giovanni Bassi (ITA)	Giuseppe Enrici (ITA)
	Total		3,613 km (2,245 mi)			

=== General classification ===
There were 30 cyclists who had completed all twelve stages. For these cyclists, the times they had needed in each stage was added up for the general classification. The cyclist with the least accumulated time was the winner. Angiolo Gabrielli won the prize for best ranked independent rider in the general classification.

Final general classification (1–10)
Rank	Name	Team	Time
1	Giuseppe Enrici (ITA)	—	143h 43' 37"
2	Federico Gay (ITA)	—	+ 58' 21"
3	Angiolo Gabrielli (ITA)	—	+ 1h 56' 53"
4	Secondo Martinetto (ITA)	—	+ 2h 13' 51"
5	Enea Dal Fiume (ITA)	—	+ 2h 19' 00"
6	Gianbattista Gilli (ITA)	—	+ 2h 59' 00"
7	Vitaliano Lugli (ITA)	—	+ 3h 28' 32"
8	Giovanni Rossignoli (ITA)	—	+ 3h 29' 08"
9	Ottavio Pratesi (ITA)	—	+ 4h 03' 00"
10	Alfredo Sivocci (ITA)	—	+ 4h 03' 36"

Final general classification (11–30)
Rank	Name	Team	Time
11	Giovanni Tragella (ITA)	—	+ 4h 21' 26"
12	Luigi Ugaglia (ITA)	—	+ 5h 21' 38"
13	Domenico Sangiorgi (ITA)	—	+ 6h 56' 41"
14	Alfredo Comminetti (ITA)	—	+ 7h 13' 52"
15	Guido Messeri (ITA)	—	+ 7h 32' 41"
16	Arturo Ferrario (ITA)	—	+ 7h 45' 35"
17	Giovanni Bassi (ITA)	—	+ 8h 10' 22"
18	Romolo Lazzaretti (ITA)	—	+ 8h 55' 32"
19	Michele Robotti (ITA)	—	+ 10h 07' 39"
20	Livio Cattel (ITA)	—	+ 10h 50' 32"
21	Domenico Tutolo (ITA)	—	+ 11h 09' 49"
22	Fortunato Manicardi (ITA)	—	+ 12h 45' 51"
23	Giuseppe Rizzo (ITA)	—	+ 15h 29' 27"
24	Enrico Sala (ITA)	—	+ 17h 12' 42"
25	Antonio Buelli (ITA)	—	+ 17h 17' 30"
26	Silvio Scrivanti (ITA)	—	+ 17h 19' 27"
27	Luigi Gilardi (ITA)	—	+ 18h 18' 39"
28	Montanari (Arturo or Giuseppe) (ITA)	—	+ 18h 30' 44"
29	Maurizio Garino (ITA)	—	+ 20h 51' 22"
30	Telesforo Benaglia (ITA)	—	+ 20h 58' 37"

== Aftermath ==
Enrici became the first foreign born winner of the Giro d'Italia. Although he maintained Italian citizenship, Enrici was born in Pittsburgh, Pennsylvania in the United States.
