= Messeri =

Messeri is a surname. Notable people with the surname include:

- Guido Messeri (1897–1972), Italian racing cyclist
- Marco Messeri (born 1948), Italian actor, comedian, stage director, singer-songwriter and voice actor
