= Alfonsina Strada =

Italian cyclist (1891–1959)

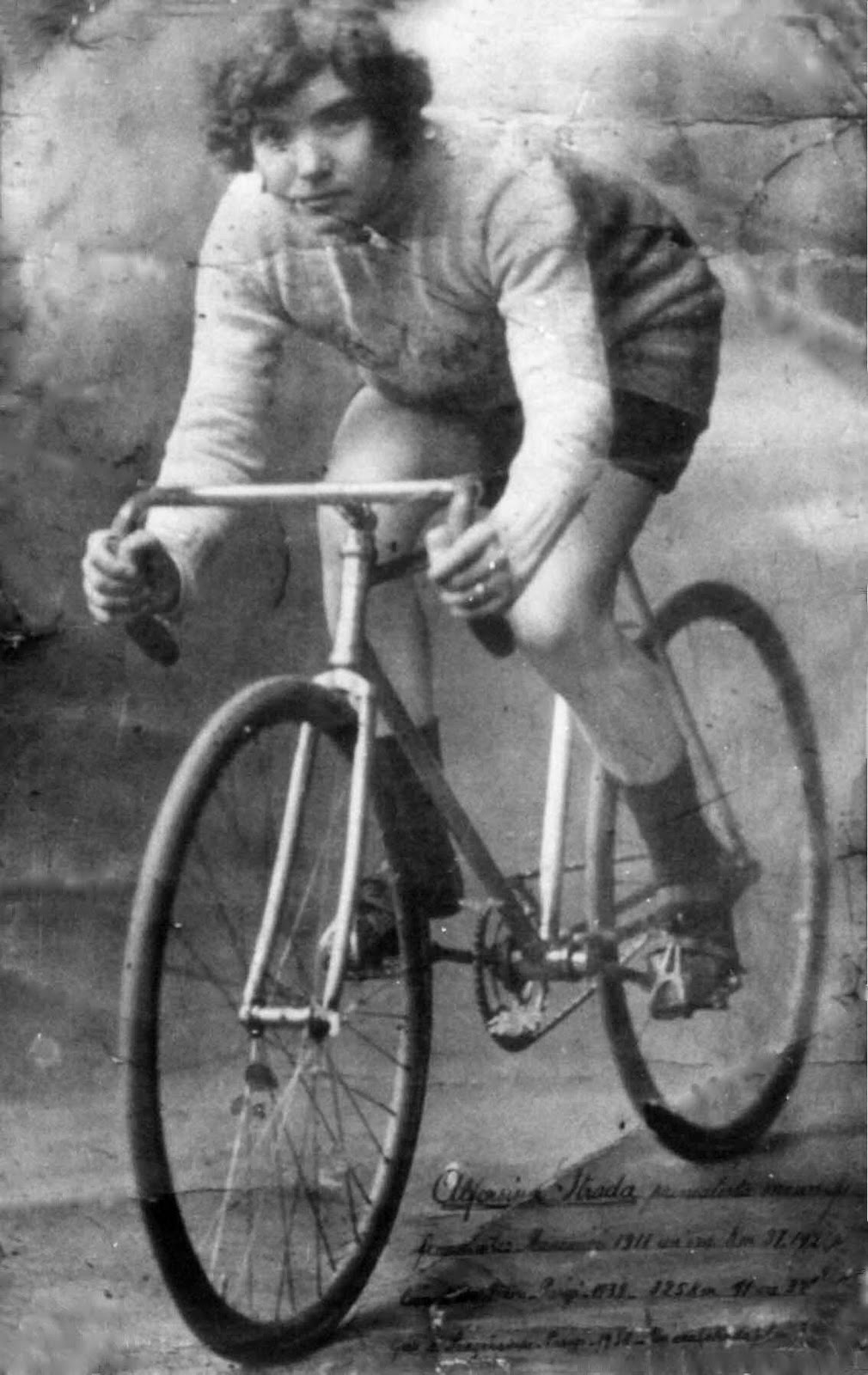

Personal information
- Full name: Alfonsina Morini Strada
- Nicknames: Alfonsin; The Devil in a dress
- Born: Alfonsina Morini; 16 March 1891 Castelfranco Emilia, Kingdom of Italy
- Died: 13 September 1959 (aged 68) Milan, Italy

Cycling career
- Sport: Cycling
- Disciplines: Road & Track
- Role: Rider

Major wins
- 36 career victories 1938 Female world record for 1 hour, 32.58 km 1911 Women's (World?) Speed record at 37 km/h.

Alfonsina Strada (née Morini; 16 March 1891 – 13 September 1959) was an Italian cyclist, the only woman to have ridden one of cycling's three major stage races. She started in the Giro d'Italia in 1924 when the organisers mistook her for a man. Newspapers called her The Devil in a dress.

Her racing career included an Italian record which lasted 26 years. She died aged 69 as she propped up her motorcycle after riding it to a bicycle race.

== Early life ==
Born Alfonsina Morini at Castelfranco Emilia, near Modena, she was the daughter of a peasant family. Her father was a day labourer, her mother a wet nurse. One account says her house was a windowless shack through which chickens ran; another says she was one of 24 living there. Further reports speak of her family considering her passion for cycling to have been the work of the devil, that it had the evil eye. Some reports say that she was one of eight children; others that she was one of 10, with eight brothers; still others that she had 10 brothers. Her living conditions as a child may have been romanticised by reporters and gone unexamined as her legend grew.

According to lore, Morini grew up a tomboy, playing with her brothers and their friends and riding her father's bicycle until she was 10 and her father bought her a bike in exchange for chickens. Romantic accounts say that villagers crossed themselves as she rode past, dressed and behaving more like a boy than a girl. Her mother is said to have pressed her to become a seamstress.

She rode her first race at about 13, winning a live pig. She won nearly all the girls' races she entered and many of the boys' events. Her reputation brought an invitation to ride the Grand Prix of St Petersburg in Russia in 1909. She was such a success that the Tsarina Alexandra⋅wanted her husband, Tsar Nicholas II of Russia, to give her a gold medal.

In 1911 she went to Moncalieri, now in the southern suburbs of Turin, and set an hour record of 37.192 km. The status of the record is uncertain. It appears to have stood since 1905 but some reports say that Morini wasn't credited with her distance because her ride had been considered unladylike. Since that wouldn't have been an issue had she simply improved the women's record, there's a suggestion that she may also have broken a male record, perhaps a regional one, and it was that which she was denied. Her distance stood for 26 years. Evidence of this record only appeared in 1938.

She won 36 races against men and became the friend of riders such as Costante Girardengo. She raced at Bologna and Paris and twice rode the Giro di Lombardia at a time when it was open to all. She finished 32nd and last in the 1917 race, an hour and 34 minutes behind the Belgian Philippe Thys. She completed the 204 km course in 8h 32m. She rode again in 1918 and finished 21st, ahead of several men.

== Marriage ==
In 1915, when 24, Morini married Luigi Strada, a metal plater and engraver, who was also a rider and racer. He gave her a new racing bike with dropped bars as a present. The couple moved to Milan, where Alfonsina rode on the velodrome as Luigi acted as her trainer.

== 1924 Giro d'Italia ==
Strada's ride in the Giro d'Italia came about through a disagreement between the organiser, Emilio Colombo of Gazzetta dello Sport, and the top riders of the day. The riders refused to take part. Colombo did what the Tour de France had done and offered places to whoever wanted to ride. Gazzetta dello Sport promised to pay their bills, their hotels and their food. It offered places for 90 riders and promised 600 chickens, 750 kg of other meat, 4,800 bananas and 720 eggs. But there would be no managers, no masseurs, no mechanics and no team cars.

Strada entered as "Strada, Alfonsin." The absence of a final "o" or "a" to her first name hid her gender. She was accepted as number 72 and, assuming her to be a man, journalists began writing of Alfonsino. The truth emerged the day before the start and by then it was too late.

She came 74th on the first day, an hour behind the leader but not badly by the standard of the day, when riders could be separated by hours. She finished 50th of 65 between Genoa and Florence and survived as far as Naples. Then the weather turned. A gale blew, rain poured, mud and rocks swept across the road. Strada was among many who crashed. Her handlebar snapped and she stood by the roadside until a peasant snapped a broomstick to jam in the hole. She rode on with one side of her bar of steel and the other made from a broomstick but finished outside the time limit.

Radio Marconi said

The Foggia-L'Aquila – 7th stage was 304 km, which was bad enough because the southern Italian roads at this time were nearly impassable. They were not paved, and were rocky and icy too. The mountain pass was so terrible that the riders could not get their bikes through the mire and mess on their own and almost all the participants were towed part way by motorcycles and cars. Alfonsina suffered terribly on this stage. She fell on a descent and had to ride many more hours using her bruised, scraped and swollen knee.

The race referees excluded her because she was out of time. The organiser, Colombo, couldn't stop them from applying his own rules but by then spectators were waiting to see her and her rides were producing stories for his reporters. Some reports say that Colombo had to balance sentiment, commercial benefit, the political climate and Italian fascism's intolerance of her challenge to machismo. Colombo let her ride on as an individual, paying her bills but excluding her from prizes.

The next day was to Fiume, where a crowd lifted her from her bicycle and carried her in triumph when she finished in tears from pain and exhaustion 25 minutes after the time limit. It motivated her to continue to Milan. Only 38 completed the race and Strada, although no longer formally in the running, finished more than 20 hours ahead of Telesforo Benaglia, the maglia nera. She finished 28 hours behind the winner, 30-year-old Giuseppe Enrici of Piedmont. However, almost an hour separated Enrici from his runner-up, Federico Gay, so it was hardly a close-run race. With two riders finishing behind her, Strada won 50,000 lire for her efforts.

== Later career ==
Strada was never allowed to ride the Giro again, but she followed it for several years and earned the respect of the journalist Armando Cougnet, Giardini, Colombo, Cattaneo, Lattuarda, Costante Girardengo, as well as of other journalists and competitors. She rode exhibition races throughout Italy, Spain, France, Luxembourg and before Tsar Nicholas II of Russia in Saint Petersburg. In 1937, in Paris, she defeated the French champion, Robin. In 1925 she sought to enter the Tour de France.

In 1938 Strada made an attempt on the 12-hour record, riding on a circuit in St Germain, in Paris. She covered a distance of 324 kms, less than Jessie Springall's 342.380 kms covered on England. She then made an attempt on Jeanine Zuschmitt's hour record (35.670 kms), covering a reported distance of between 33.990 and 35.288 kms.

The Italian writer Dino Buzzati wrote that, as a boy riding in a park in Milan, he saw Strada and managed to stay with her for two laps before "exploding". He said that after that she shot off down the path like an arrow.

== Personal life and death ==
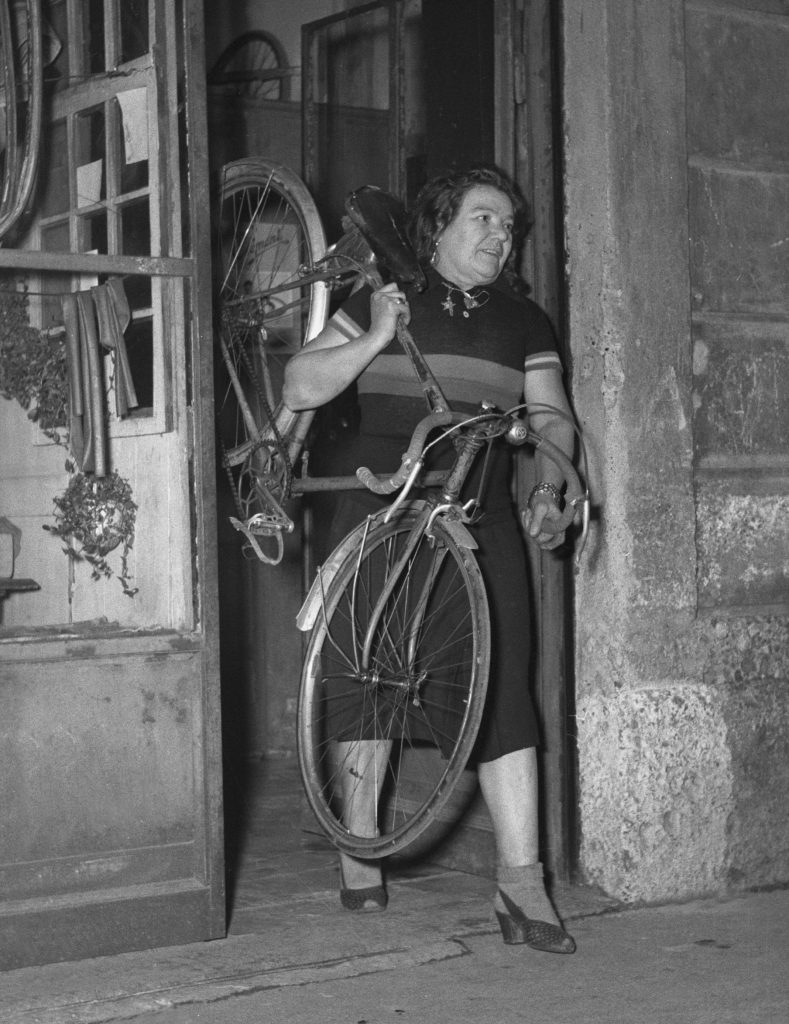
Alfonsina Strada at her bicycle shop

Luigi Strada died in 1946. In 1950 Strada married Carlo Messori, a retired racing cyclist, and they opened a bicycle shop on Via Varesina in Milan. He started to write her biography but he died in 1957 before it was completed and she closed the shop.

She lived alone in Milan for her last years, riding to her shop every day until cycling grew too tiring. She sold some of her medals and trophies and bought a scarlet Moto Guzzi 500cc motorbike. In September 1959 she rode this to the Tre Valli Varesine professional race. The motorbike fell off its stand when she got home. The weight was too much for her and she had a heart attack as she and the Moto Guzzi fell to the ground. She was dead by the time she reached hospital.

Her bicycle is among the collection at the Madonna del Ghisallo chapel close to Lake Como in Italy.

== Memories of Alfonsina Strada ==
In 2010 the Italian band Têtes de bois published the song "Alfonsina e la bici" dedicated to Alfonsina Strada.

The videoclip of the song has the Italian astrophysicist Margherita Hack starring as Alfonsina Strada.

From 2024 onwards, the first rider to pass the highest climb of Giro d'Italia Women cycling race is awarded the "Cima Alfonsina Strada" – a prize named in honour of Strada.

== Sources ==
- Facchinetti, Paolo (2004). Gli anni ruggenti di Alfonsina Strada. Il romanzo dell'unica donna che ha corso il giro d'Italia assieme agli uomini. ISBN 978-88-88829-03-6.
