= Pasquale Di Pietro =

Italian cyclist

Personal information
- Born: 25 March 1894

Cycling career
- Sport: Cycling
- Discipline: Road
- Role: Rider

Pasquale Di Pietro (born 25 March 1894, date of death unknown) was an Italian racing cyclist. He rode in the 1924 Tour de France.
