= Azeglio Terreni =

Italian cyclist (1895–?)

Personal information
- Born: 26 February 1895 Turin, Kingdom of Italy
- Died: Unknown

Cycling career
- Sport: Cycling
- Discipline: Road
- Role: Rider

Professional team
- 1923: Fusarp–Wolber

Azeglio Terreni (26 February 1895 – date of death unknown) was an Italian racing cyclist. He rode in the 1927 Tour de France.
