= Giuseppe Borghi =

Italian cyclist

Personal information
- Born: 28 September 1892

Cycling career
- Sport: Cycling
- Discipline: Road
- Role: Rider

Giuseppe Borghi (born 28 September 1892, date of death unknown) was an Italian racing cyclist. He rode in the 1925 Tour de France.
