= Arturo Ferrario =

Italian cyclist (1891–1966)

Personal information
- Born: 28 June 1891 Milan, Italy
- Died: 31 December 1966 (aged 75)

Cycling career
- Sport: Cycling
- Role: Rider

Arturo Ferrario (28 June 1891 – 31 December 1966) was an Italian racing cyclist. He won stages 9 and 11 of the 1924 Giro d'Italia.
