= Alfredo Comminetti =

Italian cyclist

Personal information
- Born: 16 October 1895
- Died: 26 October 1981 (aged 86)

Cycling career
- Sport: Cycling
- Discipline: Road
- Role: Rider

Alfredo Comminetti (16 October 1895 – 26 October 1981) was an Italian racing cyclist. He rode in the 1925 Tour de France.
