= Luigi Ugaglia =

Italian cyclist

Personal information
- Born: 2 December 1897 Cremona, Kingdom of Italy

Cycling career
- Sport: Cycling
- Discipline: Road
- Role: Rider

Luigi Ugaglia (born 2 December 1897, date of death unknown) was an Italian racing cyclist. He rode in the 1924 Tour de France.
