= Federico Gay (cyclist) =

Italian cyclist

Personal information
- Born: 16 July 1896 Turin, Italy
- Died: 15 April 1989 (aged 92) Turin, Italy

Cycling career
- Sport: Cycling
- Discipline: Road
- Role: Rider

Major wins
- 4 stages 1924 Giro d'Italia; 1 stage 1922 Tour de France

Federico Gay (16 July 1896 – 15 April 1989) was an Italian professional road bicycle racer, who won four stages in the 1924 Giro d'Italia, and one stage in the 1922 Tour de France. He rode the Tour de France twice, finishing 11th in 1922 and 10th in 1925. His best result in the Giro d'Italia was in 1924, when he finished second in the overall classification. He competed in two events at the 1920 Summer Olympics.

He was born and died in Turin.

== Major results ==
1921
Milano–Torino
1922
Tour de France:

Winner stage 13

1924
Giro d'Italia:

Winner stages 2, 3, 5 and 6
2nd place overall classification

Milano–Torino
1925
Zürich-Berlin
1932
Italy national track stayers championship
