= Romolo Lazzaretti =

Italian cyclist (1895–1976)

Personal information
- Born: 17 November 1895 Arcidosso, Italy

Cycling career
- Sport: Cycling
- Role: Rider

Romolo Lazzaretti (17 November 1895 – 3 November 1976) was an Italian racing cyclist. He won stage 10 of the 1924 Giro d'Italia.
