= Guido Messeri =

Italian cyclist

Personal information
- Born: 4 September 1897
- Died: 27 December 1972 (aged 75)

Cycling career
- Sport: Cycling
- Discipline: Road
- Role: Rider

Guido Messeri (4 September 1897 – 27 December 1972) was an Italian racing cyclist. He rode in the 1925 Tour de France.
