= Giuseppe Enrici =

Italian cyclist

Personal information
- Full name: Giuseppe Enrici
- Born: 2 January 1896 Pittsburgh, Pennsylvania, U.S.
- Died: 1 September 1968 (aged 72) Nice, France

Cycling career
- Sport: Cycling
- Discipline: Road
- Role: Rider

Professional teams
- 1921: Individual
- 1922–1924: Legnano
- 1925: Armor-Dunlop
- 1926: Automoto-Hutchinson
- 1927–1928: Individual

Major wins
- Grand Tours Giro d'Italia General classification (1924) 2 individual stages (1924)

Giuseppe Enrici (2 January 1896 – 1 September 1968) was an Italian professional road racing cyclist. The highlight of his career was winning the 1924 Giro d'Italia.

Enrici was born in Pittsburgh, USA, in an Italian family, which meant he had American citizenship. As a child, his family moved back to Piemonte, and Enrici regained Italican citizenship.

Enrici took third place in the 1922 Giro d'Italia, and when several favourites did not join the 1924 Giro, he was one of the mai ncontenders, and won. He continued to race for four more years, and ended his professional career in 1928.
