= 1912 Tour de France, Stage 9 to Stage 15 =

Cycling race stages

Route of the 1912 Tour de France

The 1912 Tour de France was the 10th edition of Tour de France, one of cycling's Grand Tours. The Tour began in Paris on 30 June and Stage 9 occurred on 16 July with a flat stage from Perpignan. The race finished in Paris on 28 July.

== Stage 9 ==
18 July 1912 — Perpignan to Luchon, 289 km (180 mi)

Stage 9 result

Rank	Rider	Team	Time
1	Odile Defraye (BEL)	Alcyon–Dunlop	10h 24' 57"
2	Eugène Christophe (FRA)	Armor	+ 2' 38"
3	Marcel Buysse (BEL)	Peugeot–Wolber	+ 8' 22"
4	Jacques Coomans (BEL)	Thomann	+ 11' 12"
5	Gustave Garrigou (FRA)	Alcyon–Dunlop	+ 15' 23"
6	Louis Heusghem (BEL)	Alcyon–Dunlop	s.t.
7	Félicien Salmon (BEL)	Peugeot–Wolber	s.t.
8	Henri Devroye (BEL)	Le Globe–Russian	s.t.
9	Louis Mottiat (BEL)	Thomann	s.t.
10	Jean Alavoine (FRA)	Armor	+ 32' 46"

General classification after stage 9

Rank	Rider	Team	Points
1	Odile Defraye (BEL)	Alcyon–Dunlop	37
2	Eugène Christophe (FRA)	Armor	57
3	Gustave Garrigou (FRA)	Alcyon–Dunlop	67
4			
5			
6			
7			
8			
9			
10			

== Stage 10 ==
18 July 1912 — Luchon to Bayonne, 326 km (202.6 mi)

Stage 10 result

Rank	Rider	Team	Time
1	Louis Mottiat (BEL)	Thomann	14h 19' 15"
2	Eugène Christophe (FRA)	Armor	s.t.
3	Odile Defraye (BEL)	Alcyon–Dunlop	+ 20' 37"
4	François Faber (LUX)	Automoto–Persan	+ 37' 40"
5	Jean Alavoine (FRA)	Armor	s.t.
6	Marcel Buysse (BEL)	Peugeot–Wolber	s.t.
7	Louis Heusghem (BEL)	Alcyon–Dunlop	s.t.
8	Henri Devroye (BEL)	Le Globe–Russian	+ 39' 02"
9	Alfons Spiessens (BEL)	JB Louvet	+ 1h 04' 45"
10	Félicien Salmon (BEL)	Peugeot–Wolber	s.t.

General classification after stage 10

Rank	Rider	Team	Points
1	Odile Defraye (BEL)	Alcyon–Dunlop	33
2	Eugène Christophe (FRA)	Armor	50
3	Gustave Garrigou (FRA)	Alcyon–Dunlop	74
4			
5			
6			
7			
8			
9			
10			

== Stage 11 ==
20 July 1912 — Bayonne to La Rochelle, 379 km (235 mi)

Stage 11 result

Rank	Rider	Team	Time
1	Jean Alavoine (FRA)	Armor	13h 11' 00"
2	Louis Heusghem (BEL)	Alcyon–Dunlop	s.t.
3	Gustave Garrigou (FRA)	Alcyon–Dunlop	s.t.
4	Louis Engel (FRA)	Aiglon–Dunlop	s.t.
5	Philippe Thys (BEL)	Peugeot–Wolber	s.t.
6	Odile Defraye (BEL)	Alcyon–Dunlop	s.t.
=7	Marcel Buysse (BEL)	Peugeot–Wolber	s.t.
=7	Eugène Christophe (FRA)	Armor	s.t.
=7	Jules Deloffre (FRA)	Lone rider	s.t.
=7	Charles Deruyter (BEL)	Peugeot–Wolber	s.t.

General classification after stage 11

Rank	Rider	Team	Points
1	Odile Defraye (BEL)	Alcyon–Dunlop	39
2	Eugène Christophe (FRA)	Armor	62
3	Gustave Garrigou (FRA)	Alcyon–Dunlop	77
4			
5			
6			
7			
8			
9			
10			

== Stage 12 ==
21 July 1912 — La Rochelle to Brest, 470 km (290 mi)

Stage 12 result

Rank	Rider	Team	Time
1	Louis Heusghem (BEL)	Alcyon–Dunlop	16h 07' 39"
2	Odile Defraye (BEL)	Alcyon–Dunlop	+ 30' 23"
3	René Vandenberghe (BEL)	Thomann	s.t.
4	Hector Tiberghien (BEL)	Griffon	s.t.
5	Louis Engel (FRA)	Aiglon–Dunlop	+ 33' 26"
6	Henri Devroye (BEL)	Le Globe–Russian	s.t.
7	Félicien Salmon (BEL)	Peugeot–Wolber	s.t.
8	Jean Alavoine (FRA)	Armor	+ 41' 49"
9	Gustave Garrigou (FRA)	Alcyon–Dunlop	+ 44' 41"
10	Ottavio Pratesi (ITA)	Lone rider	+ 45' 10"

General classification after stage 12

Rank	Rider	Team	Points
1	Odile Defraye (BEL)	Alcyon–Dunlop	41
2	Eugène Christophe (FRA)	Armor	73
3	Gustave Garrigou (FRA)	Alcyon–Dunlop	86
4			
5			
6			
7			
8			
9			
10			

== Stage 13 ==
24 July 1912 — Brest to Cherbourg-en-Cotentin, 405 km (252 mi)

Stage 13 result

Rank	Rider	Team	Time
1	Jean Alavoine (FRA)	Armor	14h 45' 16"
2	René Vandenberghe (BEL)	Thomann	s.t.
3	Odile Defraye (BEL)	Alcyon–Dunlop	s.t.
4	Philippe Thys (BEL)	Peugeot–Wolber	s.t.
5	Louis Engel (FRA)	Aiglon–Dunlop	s.t.
6	Pierino Albini (ITA)	JB Louvet	s.t.
7	Hector Tiberghien (BEL)	Griffon	s.t.
8	Eugène Christophe (FRA)	Armor	s.t.
=9	Marcel Buysse (BEL)	Peugeot–Wolber	s.t.
=9	Félicien Salmon (BEL)	Peugeot–Wolber	s.t.

General classification after stage 13

Rank	Rider	Team	Points
1	Odile Defraye (BEL)	Alcyon–Dunlop	44
2	Eugène Christophe (FRA)	Armor	81
3	Gustave Garrigou (FRA)	Alcyon–Dunlop	106
4			
5			
6			
7			
8			
9			
10			

== Stage 14 ==
26 July 1912 — Cherbourg-en-Cotentin to Le Havre, 361 km (224 mi)

Stage 14 result

Rank	Rider	Team	Time
1	Vincenzo Borgarello (ITA)	JB Louvet	12h 32' 01"
2	Jean Alavoine (FRA)	Armor	s.t.
3	René Vandenberghe (BEL)	Thomann	s.t.
4	Odile Defraye (BEL)	Alcyon–Dunlop	s.t.
5	Louis Engel (FRA)	Aiglon–Dunlop	s.t.
6	Marcel Buysse (BEL)	Peugeot–Wolber	s.t.
7	Alfons Spiessens (BEL)	JB Louvet	s.t.
8	Jacques Coomans (BEL)	Thomann	s.t.
=9	Hector Tiberghien (BEL)	Griffon	s.t.
=9	Philippe Thys (BEL)	Peugeot–Wolber	s.t.

General classification after stage 14

Rank	Rider	Team	Points
1	Odile Defraye (BEL)	Alcyon–Dunlop	48
2	Eugène Christophe (FRA)	Armor	97
3	Gustave Garrigou (FRA)	Alcyon–Dunlop	136
4			
5			
6			
7			
8			
9			
10			

== Stage 15 ==
28 July 1912 — Le Havre to Paris, 317 km (197 mi)

Stage 15 result

Rank	Rider	Team	Time
1	Jean Alavoine (FRA)	Armor	10h 55' 51"
2	René Vandenberghe (BEL)	Thomann	s.t.
3	Édouard Léonard (FRA)	JB Louvet	s.t.
4	Philippe Thys (BEL)	Peugeot–Wolber	s.t.
5	Odile Defraye (BEL)	Alcyon–Dunlop	s.t.
6	Marcel Buysse (BEL)	Peugeot–Wolber	s.t.
7	Hector Tiberghien (BEL)	Griffon	s.t.
8	Gustave Garrigou (FRA)	Alcyon–Dunlop	s.t.
9	Vincenzo Borgarello (ITA)	JB Louvet	s.t.
10	François Faber (LUX)	Automoto–Persan	s.t.

General classification after stage 15

Rank	Rider	Team	Points
1	Odile Defraye (BEL)	Alcyon–Dunlop	33
2	Eugène Christophe (FRA)	Armor	50
3	Gustave Garrigou (FRA)	Alcyon–Dunlop	74
4	Marcel Buysse (BEL)	Peugeot–Wolber	147
5	Jean Alavoine (FRA)	Armor	148
6	Philippe Thys (BEL)	Peugeot–Wolber	148
7	Hector Tiberghien (BEL)	Griffon	149
8	Henri Devroye (BEL)	Le Globe–Russian	163
9	Félicien Salmon (BEL)	Peugeot–Wolber	166
10	Alfons Spiessens (BEL)	JB Louvet	167
