= 1912 Tour de France, Stage 1 to Stage 8 =

Cycling race stages

Route of the 1912 Tour de France

The 1912 Tour de France was the 10th edition of Tour de France, one of cycling's Grand Tours. The Tour began in Paris on 30 June and Stage 8 occurred on 14 July with a flat stage to Perpignan. The race finished in Paris on 28 July.

== Stage 1 ==
30 June 1912 — Paris to Dunkerque, 351 km (218.1 mi)

Stage 1 result and general classification after stage 1

Rank	Rider	Team	Time
1	Charles Crupelandt (FRA)	La Française	11h 39' 37"
2	Hector Tiberghien (BEL)	Griffon	+ 2' 59"
3	Maurice Brocco (FRA)	La Française	+ 8' 50"
4	Pierino Albini (ITA)	JB Louvet	+ 16' 34"
5	Félicien Salmon (BEL)	Peugeot-Wolber	s.t.
6	Robert Lamon (BEL)	Armor	+ 16' 38"
7	Vincenzo Borgarello (ITA)	JB Louvet	+ 27' 32"
8	Charles Deruyter (BEL)	Peugeot-Wolber	+ 27' 33"
9	Octave Lapize (FRA)	La Française	+ 27' 45"
10	René Vandenberghe (BEL)	Thomann	+ 27' 46"

== Stage 2 ==
2 July 1912 — Dunkerque to Longwy, 388 km (241.1 mi)

Stage 2 result

Rank	Rider	Team	Time
1	Odile Defraye (BEL)	Alcyon-Dunlop	13h 01' 08"
2	Gustave Garrigou (FRA)	Alcyon-Dunlop	s.t.
3	Eugène Christophe (FRA)	Armor	+ 10' 53"
4	Philippe Thys (BEL)	Peugeot-Wolber	s.t.
5	Alfons Spiessens (BEL)	JB Louvet	s.t.
6	François Faber (LUX)	Automoto-Persan	+ 19' 29"
7	Vincenzo Borgarello (ITA)	JB Louvet	+ 19' 51"
8	Oscar Egg (SUI)	Griffon	+ 21' 15"
9	Firmin Lambot (BEL)	Le Globe-Russian	+ 32' 04"
10	Marcel Buysse (BEL)	Peugeot-Wolber	+ 32' 06"

General classification after stage 2

Rank	Rider	Team	Points
1	Vincenzo Borgarello (ITA)	JB Louvet	14
2	Odile Defraye (BEL)	Alcyon-Dunlop	15
3	Charles Deruyter (BEL)	Peugeot-Wolber	20
4			
5			
6			
7			
8			
9			
10			

== Stage 3 ==
4 July 1912 — Longwy to Belfort, 331 km (206 mi)

Stage 3 result

Rank	Rider	Team	Time
1	Eugène Christophe (FRA)	Armor	11h 04' 54"
2	Odile Defraye (BEL)	Alcyon-Dunlop	s.t.
3	Gustave Garrigou (FRA)	Alcyon-Dunlop	s.t.
4	Octave Lapize (FRA)	La Française	+ 1' 06"
5	Vincenzo Borgarello (ITA)	JB Louvet	+ 3' 27"
6	Charles Deruyter (BEL)	Peugeot-Wolber	s.t.
7	René Vandenberghe (BEL)	Thomann	+ 6' 03"
8	Marcel Buysse (BEL)	Peugeot-Wolber	s.t.
9	Charles Crupelandt (FRA)	La Française	+ 8' 25"
10	Jean Alavoine (FRA)	Armor	+ 9' 06"

General classification after stage 3

Rank	Rider	Team	Points
1	Odile Defraye (BEL)	Alcyon-Dunlop	17
2	Vincenzo Borgarello (ITA)	JB Louvet	19
3	Octave Lapize (FRA)	La Française	24
4			
5			
6			
7			
8			
9			
10			

== Stage 4 ==
6 July 1912 — Belfort to Chamonix, 344 km (214 mi)

Stage 4 result

Rank	Rider	Team	Time
1	Eugène Christophe (FRA)	Armor	12h 04' 17"
2	François Faber (LUX)	Automoto-Persan	+ 13' 25"
3	Odile Defraye (BEL)	Alcyon-Dunlop	s.t.
4	Octave Lapize (FRA)	La Française	+ 15' 57"
5	Marcel Buysse (BEL)	Peugeot-Wolber	+ 20' 44"
6	Louis Heusghem (BEL)	Alcyon-Dunlop	+ 21' 59"
7	Philippe Thys (BEL)	Peugeot-Wolber	+ 31' 01"
8	Albert Dupont (BEL)	Le Globe-Russian	s.t.
9	Firmin Lambot (BEL)	Le Globe-Russian	+ 40' 01"
10	Alfons Spiessens (BEL)	JB Louvet	+ 40' 30"

General classification after stage 4

Rank	Rider	Team	Points
1	Odile Defraye (BEL)	Alcyon-Dunlop	20
2	Octave Lapize (FRA)	La Française	28
3	Eugène Christophe (FRA)	Armor	28
4			
5			
6			
7			
8			
9			
10			

== Stage 5 ==
8 July 1912 — Chamonix to Grenoble, 366 km (227 mi)

Stage 5 result

Rank	Rider	Team	Time
1	Eugène Christophe (FRA)	Armor	13h 40' 23"
2	Octave Lapize (FRA)	La Française	+ 2' 37"
3	Gustave Garrigou (FRA)	Alcyon-Dunlop	+ 9' 33"
4	Félicien Salmon (BEL)	Peugeot-Wolber	s.t.
5	Hector Tiberghien (BEL)	Griffon	s.t.
6	Marcel Buysse (BEL)	Peugeot-Wolber	+ 17' 58"
7	Henri Devroye (BEL)	Le Globe-Russian	+ 19' 37"
8	Charles Crupelandt (FRA)	La Française	+ 26' 17"
9	Odile Defraye (BEL)	Alcyon-Dunlop	+ 30' 44"
10	Firmin Lambot (BEL)	Le Globe-Russian	+ 34' 18"

General classification after stage 5

Rank	Rider	Team	Points
1	Odile Defraye (BEL)	Alcyon-Dunlop	29
2	Eugène Christophe (FRA)	Armor	29
3	Octave Lapize (FRA)	La Française	30
4			
5			
6			
7			
8			
9			
10			

== Stage 6 ==
10 July 1912 — Grenoble to Nice, 323 km (201 mi)

Stage 6 result

Rank	Rider	Team	Time
1	Octave Lapize (FRA)	La Française	12h 09' 27"
2	Odile Defraye (BEL)	Alcyon-Dunlop	+ 6' 33"
3	Pierino Albini (ITA)	JB Louvet	+ 20' 51"
4	Eugène Christophe (FRA)	Armor	s.t.
5	Marcel Godivier (FRA)	La Française	+ 23' 18"
6	Charles Crupelandt (FRA)	La Française	s.t.
7	Louis Heusghem (BEL)	Alcyon-Dunlop	s.t.
8	Hector Tiberghien (BEL)	Griffon	s.t.
9	Félicien Salmon (BEL)	Peugeot-Wolber	+ 23' 38"
10	Jean Alavoine (FRA)	Armor	+ 36' 55"

General classification after stage 6

Rank	Rider	Team	Points
1	Odile Defraye (BEL)	Alcyon-Dunlop	31
2	Octave Lapize (FRA)	La Française	31
3	Eugène Christophe (FRA)	Armor	33
4			
5			
6			
7			
8			
9			
10			

== Stage 7 ==
12 July 1912 — Nice to Marseille, 334 km (208 mi)

Stage 7 result

Rank	Rider	Team	Time
1	Odile Defraye (BEL)	Alcyon-Dunlop	12h 06' 00"
2	Gustave Garrigou (FRA)	Alcyon-Dunlop	s.t.
3	Firmin Lambot (BEL)	Le Globe-Russian	s.t.
4	Octave Lapize (FRA)	La Française	s.t.
5	Eugène Christophe (FRA)	Armor	s.t.
6	Félicien Salmon (BEL)	Peugeot-Wolber	s.t.
7	René Vandenberghe (BEL)	Thomann	+ 6' 00"
8	Philippe Thys (BEL)	Peugeot-Wolber	s.t.
9	Charles Crupelandt (FRA)	La Française	+ 8' 00"
10	Jean Alavoine (FRA)	Armor	+ 10' 00"

General classification after stage 7

Rank	Rider	Team	Points
1	Odile Defraye (BEL)	Alcyon-Dunlop	32
2	Octave Lapize (FRA)	La Française	35
3	Eugène Christophe (FRA)	Armor	38
4			
5			
6			
7			
8			
9			
10			

== Stage 8 ==
14 July 1912 — Marseille to Perpignan, 335 km (208.2 mi)

Stage 8 result

Rank	Rider	Team	Time
1	Vincenzo Borgarello (ITA)	JB Louvet	12h 47' 57"
2	Marcel Godivier (FRA)	La Française	s.t.
3	Octave Lapize (FRA)	La Française	s.t.
4	Odile Defraye (BEL)	Alcyon-Dunlop	s.t.
5	Alfons Spiessens (BEL)	JB Louvet	s.t.
6	Gustave Garrigou (FRA)	Alcyon-Dunlop	s.t.
7	Philippe Thys (BEL)	Peugeot-Wolber	s.t.
8	Eugène Dhers (FRA)	Automoto-Persan	s.t.
9	Marcel Buysse (BEL)	Peugeot-Wolber	s.t.
10	Hector Tiberghien (BEL)	Griffon	s.t.

General classification after stage 8

Rank	Rider	Team	Points
1	Odile Defraye (BEL)	Alcyon-Dunlop	36
2	Octave Lapize (FRA)	La Française	38
3	Eugène Christophe (FRA)	Armor	55
4			
5			
6			
7			
8			
9			
10			
