= 1922 Milan–San Remo =

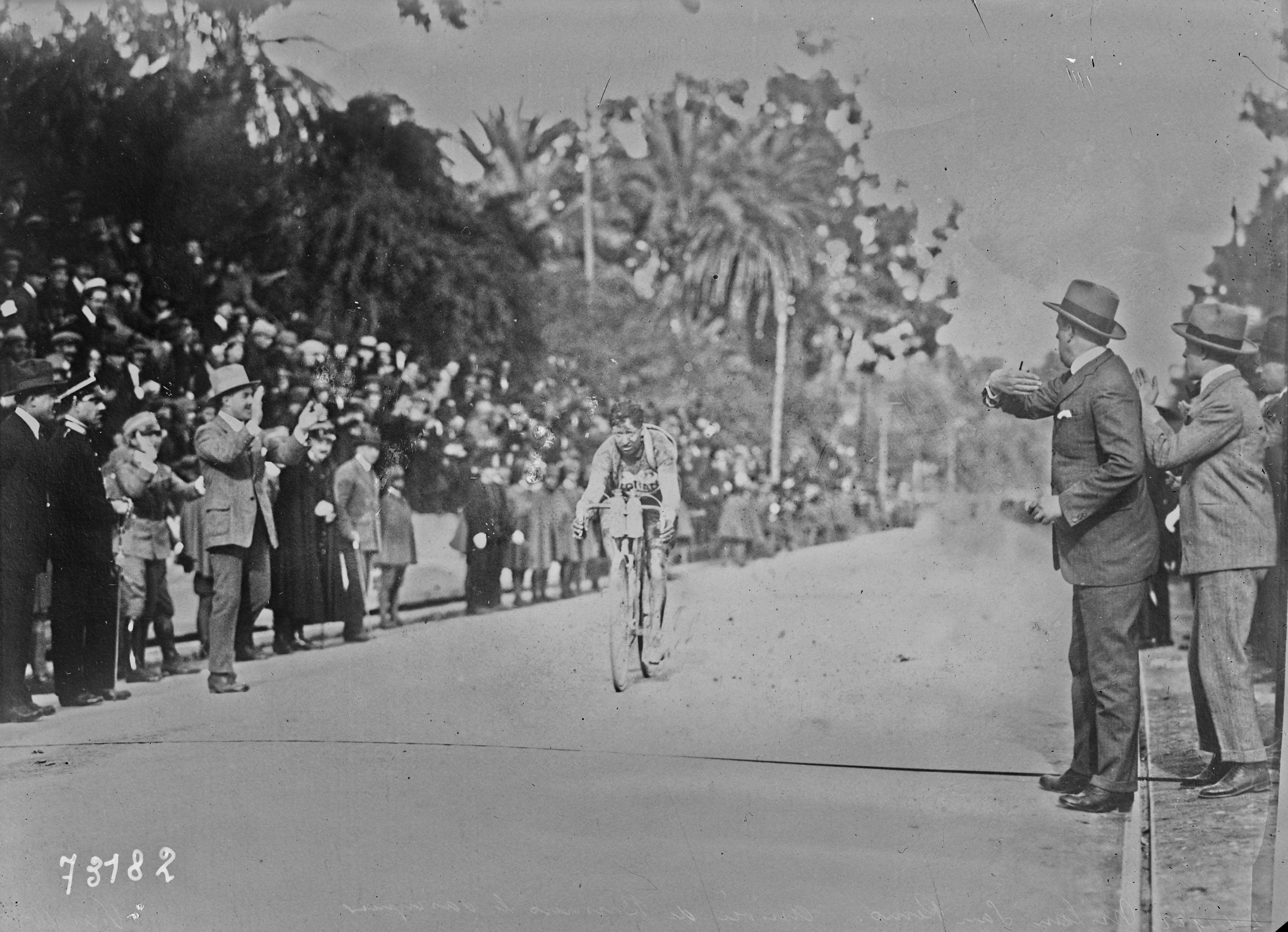

Race details
- Dates: 28 March 1922
- Stages: 1
- Distance: 286.5 km (178.0 mi)
- Winning time: 10h 14' 31"

Results
	Winner	Giovanni Brunero (ITA)
	Second	Costante Girardengo (ITA)
	Third	Bartolomeo Aimo (ITA)

The 1922 Milan–San Remo was the 15th edition of the Milan–San Remo cycle race and was held on 28 March 1922. The race started in Milan and finished in San Remo. The race was won by Giovanni Brunero.

== General classification ==
Final general classification

Rank	Rider	Time
1	Giovanni Brunero (ITA)	10h 14' 31"
2	Costante Girardengo (ITA)	+ 22"
3	Bartolomeo Aimo (ITA)	+ 39"
4	Adriano Zanaga (ITA)	+ 44"
5	Alfredo Sivocci (ITA)	+ 10' 39"
6	Pietro Bestetti (ITA)	+ 16' 49"
7	Ugo Agostoni (ITA)	+ 24' 33"
8	Pietro Linari (ITA)	+ 35' 42"
9	Franco Giorgetti (ITA)	+ 35' 42"
10	Luigi Annoni (ITA)	+ 35' 42"
