= 1922 Giro d'Italia =

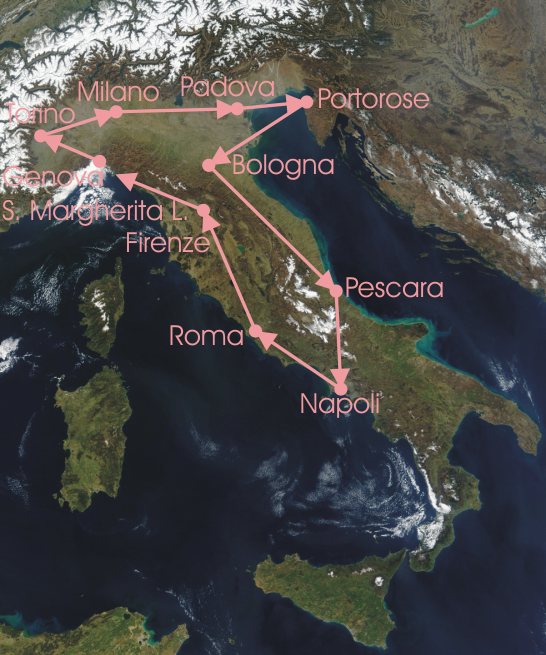
- Race Route

Race details
- Dates: 24 May – 11 June 1922
- Stages: 10
- Distance: 3,095 km (1,923 mi)
- Winning time: 119h 43' 00"

Results
	Winner	Giovanni Brunero (ITA)	(Legnano)
	Second	Bartolomeo Aymo (ITA)	(Legnano)
	Third	Giuseppe Enrici (ITA)	(Legnano)
	Team	Legnano	

The 1922 Giro d'Italia was the tenth edition of the Giro d'Italia, a Grand Tour organized and sponsored by the newspaper La Gazzetta dello Sport. The race began on 24 May in Milan with a stage that stretched 326 km (203 mi) to Padua, finishing back in Milan on 11 June after a 348 km (216 mi) stage and a total distance covered of 3,095 km (1,923 mi). The race was won by the Italian rider Giovanni Brunero of the Legnano team. Second and third respectively were the Italian riders Bartolomeo Aymo and Giuseppe Enrici.

== Participants ==
Of the 75 riders that began the Giro d'Italia on 24 May, fifteen of them made it to the finish in Milan on 11 June. Riders were allowed to ride on their own or as a member of a team. There were four teams that competed in the race: Bianchi-Salga, Ganna-Dunlop, Legnano-Pirelli, and Maino-Bergougnan.

The peloton was almost completely composed of Italians. The field featured three former Giro d'Italia champion in the 1919 Giro d'Italia winner Costante Girardengo, 1920 Giro d'Italia winner Gaetano Belloni and 1921 Giro d'Italia winner Giovanni Brunero. Other notable Italian riders that started the race included Bartolomeo Aymo.

== Race summary ==
In the first stage, Giovanni Brunero was leading the race solo, when he crashed, and broke a wheel. When his team mate Alfredo Sivocci reached him, Sivocci gave his wheel to Brunero. Brunero continued and won the stage. However, wheel changes were not allowed, so the competing teams appealed to the jury, requesting Brunero to be disqualified. The jury did so, but after appeal from Brunero and his team, they allowed Brunero to continue, and asked the Italian Cycling federation to decide what should happen.

Brunero thus started the second stage as leader. That second stage was won by Girardengo, but Brunero remained in the lead. In the third stage, all riders finished in the same time (the first time that this happened in the Giro), so Brunero remained leader. However, the Italian cycling federation came with a verdict: Brunero was allowed to continue in the Giro, but was given a penalty of 25 minutes. This made Belloni the new leader, with Girardengo in second place. Belloni and Girardengo were not satisfied with this outcome, and thought that Brunero should have been disqualified; out of protest, they and their teams left the race. The Legnano team was now almost unopposed, and Bartolomeo Aymo became the new leader in the general classification, with Brunero just behind him.

Aymo remained leader until the seventh stage, where Brunero made use of his superior climbing skills, gaining a few minutes on his team mate. Over the next stages, Brunero extended his lead, and became the winner of the 1922 Giro.

== Final standings ==
=== Stage results ===
Stage results
Stage	Date	Course	Distance	Type (Note: In 1922, there was no distinction in the rules between plain stages and mountain stages; the icons shown here indicate that the first, fifth, sixth, seventh, eighth, and ninth stages included major mountains.)	Winner	Race Leader
1	24 May	Milan to Padua	326 km (203 mi)	Stage with mountain(s)	Gaetano Belloni (ITA)	Gaetano Belloni (ITA)
2	26 May	Padua to Portorose	268 km (167 mi)	Plain stage	Costante Girardengo (ITA)	Gaetano Belloni (ITA)
3	28 May	Portorose to Bologna	375 km (233 mi)	Plain stage	Gaetano Belloni (ITA)	Gaetano Belloni (ITA)
4	30 May	Bologna to Pescara	367 km (228 mi)	Plain stage	Alfredo Sivocci (ITA)	Bartolomeo Aymo (ITA)
5	1 June	Pescara to Naples	267 km (166 mi)	Stage with mountain(s)	Bartolomeo Aymo (ITA)	Bartolomeo Aymo (ITA)
6	3 June	Naples to Rome	254 km (158 mi)	Stage with mountain(s)	Pietro Linari (ITA)	Bartolomeo Aymo (ITA)
7	5 June	Rome to Florence	319 km (198 mi)	Stage with mountain(s)	Giovanni Brunero (ITA)	Giovanni Brunero (ITA)
8	7 June	Florence to Santa Margherita Ligure	292 km (181 mi)	Stage with mountain(s)	Luigi Annoni (ITA)	Giovanni Brunero (ITA)
9	9 June	Genoa to Turin	277 km (172 mi)	Stage with mountain(s)	Bartolomeo Aymo (ITA)	Giovanni Brunero (ITA)
10	11 June	Turin to Milan	348 km (216 mi)	Plain stage	Giovanni Brunero (ITA)	Giovanni Brunero (ITA)
	Total		3,095 km (1,923 mi)			

=== General classification ===
There were fifteen cyclists who had completed all ten stages. For these cyclists, the times they had needed in each stage was added up for the general classification. The cyclist with the least accumulated time was the winner.

Final general classification (1–10)
Rank	Name	Team	Time
1	Giovanni Brunero (ITA)	Legnano	119h 43' 00"
2	Bartolomeo Aymo (ITA)	Legnano	+ 12' 29"
3	Giuseppe Enrici (ITA)	Legnano	+ 1h 35' 33"
4	Alfredo Sivocci (ITA)	Legnano	+ 1h 52' 13"
5	Domenico Schierano (ITA)	—	+ 4h 17' 42"
6	Pietro Aymo (ITA)	Legnano	+ 5h 28' 58"
7	Paride Ferrari (ITA)	Peugeot	+ 6h 14' 55"
8	Nicola Di Biase (ITA)	—	+ 8h 39' 36"
9	Romolo Lazzaretti (ITA)	—	+ 10h 28' 45"
10	Dino Bertolino (ITA)	—	+ 10h 59' 00"

Final general classification (11–15)
Rank	Name	Team	Time
11	Giovanni Bassi (ITA)	—	+ 11h 49' 23"
12	Angelo Guidi (ITA)	—	+ 12h 09' 48"
13	Pietro Sigbaldi (ITA)	—	+ 16h 37' 26"
14	Luigi Sinchetto (ITA)	—	+ 20h 07' 26"
15	Romolo Valpreda (ITA)	—	+ 23h 48' 14"

=== Other classifications ===
There were two other classifications contested at the race. A juniors classification was won Giuseppe Enrici and the isolati classification was won by Domenico Schierano. Each of these classifications were calculated like the general classification.
