= 1928 Milan–San Remo =

Race details
- Dates: 25 March 1928
- Stages: 1
- Distance: 286.5 km (178.0 mi)
- Winning time: 11h 36' 30"

Results
	Winner	Costante Girardengo (ITA)
	Second	Alfredo Binda (ITA)
	Third	Giovanni Brunero (ITA)

The 1928 Milan–San Remo was the 21st edition of the Milan–San Remo cycle race and was held on 25 March 1928. The race started in Milan and finished in San Remo. The race was won by Costante Girardengo.

== General classification ==
Final general classification

Rank	Rider	Time
1	Costante Girardengo (ITA)	11h 36' 30"
2	Alfredo Binda (ITA)	+ 0"
3	Giovanni Brunero (ITA)	+ 2' 30"
4	Antonio Negrini (ITA)	+ 2' 30"
5	Luigi Giacobbe (ITA)	+ 7' 30"
6	Pietro Chesi (ITA)	+ 7' 30"
7	Secondo Martinetto (ITA)	+ 10' 00"
8	Pietro Bestetti (ITA)	+ 10' 00"
9	Egidio Picchiottino (ITA)	+ 15' 30"
10	Bartolomeo Aimo (ITA)	+ 16' 00"
