= 1925 Milan–San Remo =

Race details
- Dates: 29 March 1925
- Stages: 1
- Distance: 286.5 km (178.0 mi)
- Winning time: 10h 19' 00"

Results
	Winner	Costante Girardengo (ITA)
	Second	Giovanni Brunero (ITA)
	Third	Pietro Linari (ITA)

The 1925 Milan–San Remo was the 18th edition of the Milan–San Remo cycle race and was held on 29 March 1925. The race started in Milan and finished in San Remo. The race was won by Costante Girardengo.

== General classification ==
Final general classification

Rank	Rider	Time
1	Costante Girardengo (ITA)	10h 19' 00"
2	Giovanni Brunero (ITA)	+ 0"
3	Pietro Linari (ITA)	+ 15' 00"
4	Pietro Bestetti (ITA)	+ 22' 00"
5	Ezio Cortesia (ITA)	+ 23' 50"
6	Giuseppe Pancera (ITA)	+ 23' 50"
7	Alfredo Dinale (ITA)	+ 28' 15"
8	Marco Giuntelli (ITA)	+ 28' 15"
9	Nello Ciaccheri (ITA)	+ 28' 15"
10	Aurelio Menegazzi (ITA)	+ 33' 20"
