= 1922 Giro di Lombardia =

Race details
- Dates: 5 November 1922
- Stages: 1
- Distance: 245 km (152.2 mi)
- Winning time: 9h 01' 00"

Results
	Winner	Costante Girardengo (ITA)
	Second	Giuseppe Azzini (ITA)
	Third	Bartolomeo Aimo (ITA)

The 1922 Giro di Lombardia was the 18th edition of the Giro di Lombardia cycle race and was held on 5 November 1922. The race started and finished in Milan. The race was won by Costante Girardengo of the Bianchi team.

== General classification ==
Final general classification

Rank	Rider	Team	Time
1	Costante Girardengo (ITA)	Bianchi-Salga	9h 01' 00"
2	Giuseppe Azzini (ITA)	Maino-Bergougnan	+ 0"
3	Bartolomeo Aimo (ITA)	Legnano-Pirelli	+ 0"
4	Federico Gay (ITA)	Bianchi-Salga	+ 4' 23"
5	Giovanni Brunero (ITA)	Legnano-Pirelli	+ 4' 23"
6	Angelo Gremo (ITA)	Bianchi-Salga	+ 4' 23"
7	Alfredo Cominetti (ITA)		+ 6' 05"
8	Ottavio Bottecchia (ITA)		+ 8' 39"
9	Alessandro Tonani (ITA)		+ 8' 39"
10	Michele Gordini (ITA)	Bianchi-Salga	+ 13' 49"
