= 1924 Giro di Lombardia =

Race details
- Dates: 9 November 1924
- Stages: 1
- Distance: 250 km (155.3 mi)
- Winning time: 8h 38' 23"

Results
	Winner	Giovanni Brunero (ITA)
	Second	Costante Girardengo (ITA)
	Third	Pietro Linari (ITA)

The 1924 Giro di Lombardia was the 20th edition of the Giro di Lombardia cycle race and was held on 9 November 1924. The race started and finished in Milan. The race was won by Giovanni Brunero.

== General classification ==
Final general classification

Rank	Rider	Team	Time
1	Giovanni Brunero (ITA)	Legnano	8h 38' 23"
2	Costante Girardengo (ITA)	Maino	+ 7' 44"
3	Pietro Linari (ITA)	Legnano	+ 7' 44"
4	Alfredo Binda (ITA)		+ 7' 44"
5	Ezio Cortesia (ITA)		+ 13' 19"
6	Gaetano Belloni (ITA)	Legnano	+ 18' 01"
7	Pietro Bestetti (ITA)	Maino	+ 18' 01"
8	Michele Robotti (ITA)		+ 18' 01"
9	Adriano Zanaga (ITA)	Legnano	+ 18' 01"
10	Alfredo Dinale (ITA)		+ 18' 01"
