= 1912 Tour de France =

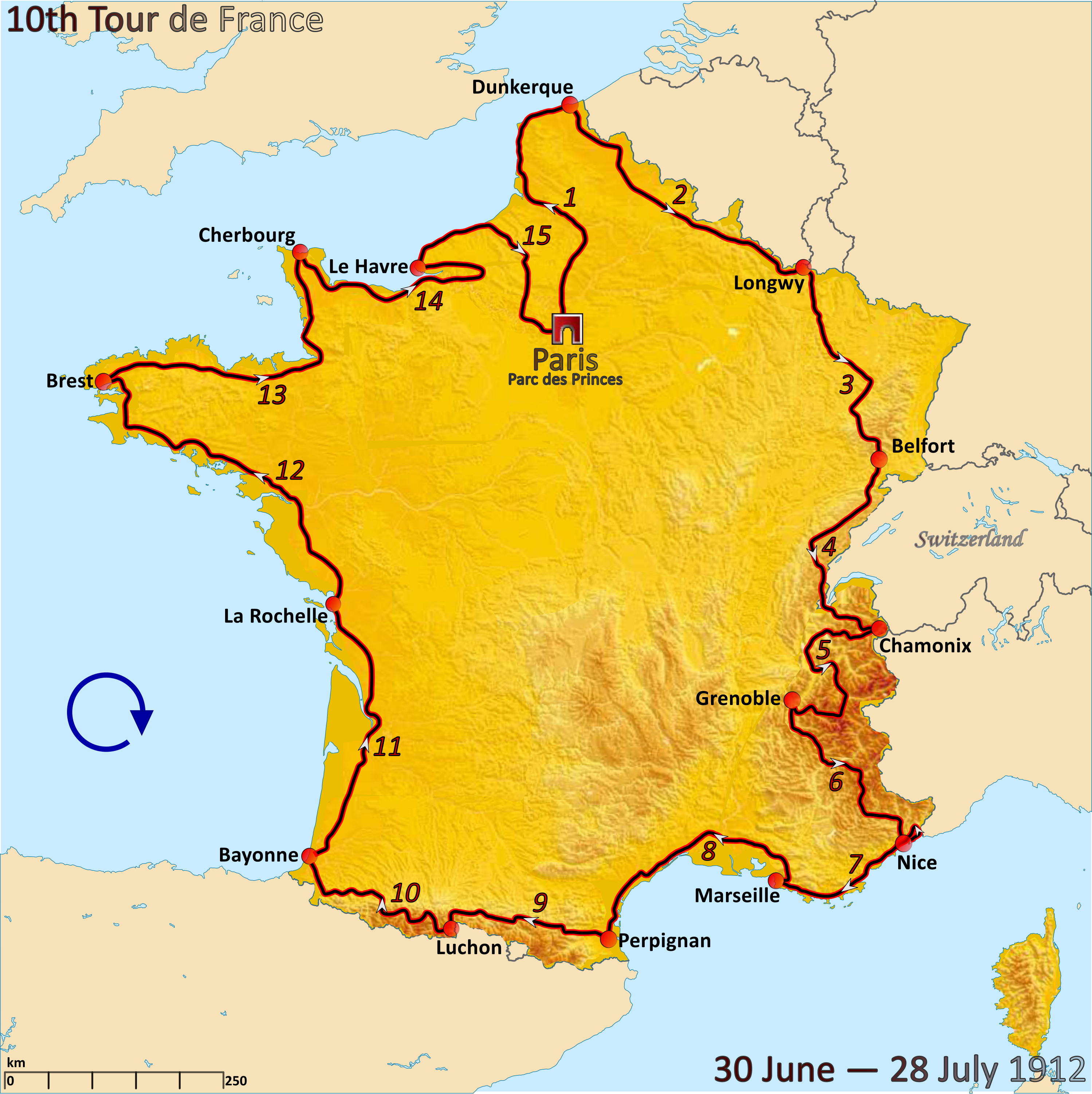
- Route of the 1912 Tour de France followed clockwise, starting in Paris

Race details
- Dates: 30 June – 28 July 1912
- Stages: 15
- Distance: 5,289 km (3,286 mi)
- Winning time: 49 points

Results
	Winner	Odile Defraye (BEL)	(Alcyon)
	Second	Eugène Christophe (FRA)	(Armor)
	Third	Gustave Garrigou (FRA)	(Alcyon)

The 1912 Tour de France was the tenth running of the Tour de France. It consisted of 15 stages for a total of 5,289 kilometres (3,286 mi). The Tour took place from 30 June to 28 July. The riders rode at an average speed of 27.763 km/h (17.251 mph). After 4 stage wins during the Tour of Belgium, the Alcyon team hired Odile Defraye to help Gustave Garrigou repeat his win of the 1911 Tour de France. However, as the race progressed, it was clear that Defraye was the stronger rider, and he was made team leader. Defraye won the 1912 Tour de France, while Garrigou came in third place.

== Innovations and changes ==
The point system from the 1911 Tour de France was still in use, including the cleaning up of the classification after stages 8 and 14. It was changed in one aspect: if one or more cyclists, excluding the first seven, finished in the same time, they split their points. In stage 8, the first thirteen cyclists finished at the same time. The first seven to cross the line got the normal number of points, but the eighth to thirteenth cyclists all got 10.5 points.

Technically, the bicycles were similar to the 1911 bicycles, only Joanny Panel, the founder of the "Le Chemineau" bicycle company, experimented with a derailleur system. This was quickly forbidden afterwards by Tour organiser Henri Desgrange, and only allowed again in 1937.

== Teams ==
The 1912 Tour started with 131 cyclists; there were 10 teams of 5 cyclists each; these 50 cyclists included all favourites for the overall victory. The remaining 81 cyclists started in the isolés category. The Alcyon team had the pre-race favourite, Gustave Garrigou, the winner of the previous Tour de France. To help him, they hired Odile Defraye, who had performed well at the 1912 Tour of Belgium. At first, the Alcyon team did not want to select Defraye, but the Belgian representative of Alcyon posed commercial threats, and Defraye was selected.

== Race overview ==
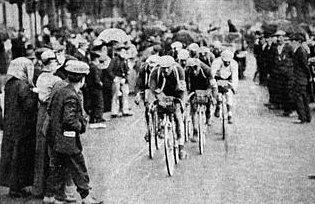
The peloton during the 1912 Tour de France.

In the first stage, the favourites remained calm. This first stage was won by Charles Crupelandt. Defraye finished 14th, while Garrigou finished in 21st place. In the second stage, Defraye and Garrigou were ahead of the rest, and Defraye won the stage. At that point, Defraye was second in the general classification, only one point behind Vincenzo Borgarello, the first Italian leader of the general classification ever. When Garrigou punctured because of nails spread by vandals, Defraye waited for him. During the long chase for the rest, it was clear that Defraye was stronger than Garrigou, who encouraged Defraye to continue alone. Defraye became a favourite for the overall victory, and his teammates gave him their support. He was the first Belgian who had a serious chance to win the Tour de France, so all Belgians in the race, regardless of their team, were helping him.

One remaining competitor was Octave Lapize. In the fifth stage, Defraye had problems with his knees, and was more than fifteen minutes behind Lapize. Defraye came back, and kept Lapize one point behind him in the general classification. In the sixth stage, Defraye attacked and only Lapize could follow, as they climbed the major Alp mountains together. Then Defraye punctured, and Lapize won the stage, so Lapize shared the lead with Defraye. In the seventh stage, Defraye punctured again, but he came back and won the stage. The eighth stage was a flat stage, and the fight was expected to continue in the ninth stage. Before the ninth stage, Lapize was only 2 points behind. During that stage in the Pyrenees, Defraye broke away on the Col de Portet d'Aspet, and Lapize could not follow. Later, Lapize stopped in protest because all the Belgians were riding for Defraye. Lapize said: "How can you expect me to challenge in such conditions?" The rest of his team La Française, the two remaining Charles Crupelandt and Marcel Godivier did not start the next stage, also in protest.

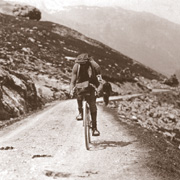
Eugène Christophe, climbing the Galibier on the way to his third consecutive stage victory.

Eugene Christophe, who dominated in the Alps with three consecutive stage victories, including the longest solo breakaway ever of 315 kilometres (196 mi) and had shared the lead after his third stage victory, became the second-placed cyclist after Lapize's retreat. Christophe was not a good sprinter, so he had to break away from Defraye to win back points. With all the Belgians helping Defraye, he could not do this anymore. He could pose no real threat, and Defraye won the overall victory unchallenged. If the Tour de France was decided on time instead of points, Christophe would have led the race until the final stage, where he accepted his loss and allowed a group including Defraye to ride away.

== Results ==
=== Stage winners ===
Stage characteristics and winners
Stage	Date	Course	Distance	Type (Note: In 1912, there was no distinction in the rules between plain stages and mountain stages; the icons shown here indicate which stages included mountains.)	Winner	Race leader
1	30 June	Paris to Dunkerque	351 km (218 mi)	Plain stage	Charles Crupelandt (FRA)	Charles Crupelandt (FRA)
2	2 July	Dunkerque to Longwy	388 km (241 mi)	Plain stage	Odile Defraye (BEL)	Vicenzo Borgarello (ITA)
3	4 July	Longwy to Belfort	331 km (206 mi)	Stage with mountain(s)	Eugène Christophe (FRA)	Odile Defraye (BEL)
4	6 July	Belfort to Chamonix	344 km (214 mi)	Stage with mountain(s)	Eugène Christophe (FRA)	Odile Defraye (BEL)
5	8 July	Chamonix to Grenoble	366 km (227 mi)	Stage with mountain(s)	Eugène Christophe (FRA)	Odile Defraye (BEL); Eugène Christophe (FRA) (Note: After the fifth stage, Defraye and Christophe had the same number of points.)
6	10 July	Grenoble to Nice	323 km (201 mi)	Stage with mountain(s)	Octave Lapize (FRA)	Odile Defraye (BEL); Octave Lapize (FRA) (Note: After the sixth stage, Defraye and Lapize had the same number of points.)
7	12 July	Nice to Marseille	334 km (208 mi)	Stage with mountain(s)	Odile Defraye (BEL)	Odile Defraye (BEL)
8	14 July	Marseille to Perpignan	335 km (208 mi)	Plain stage	Vicenzo Borgarello (ITA)	Odile Defraye (BEL)
9	16 July	Perpignan to Luchon	289 km (180 mi)	Stage with mountain(s)	Odile Defraye (BEL)	Odile Defraye (BEL)
10	18 July	Luchon to Bayonne	326 km (203 mi)	Stage with mountain(s)	Louis Mottiat (BEL)	Odile Defraye (BEL)
11	20 July	Bayonne to La Rochelle	379 km (235 mi)	Plain stage	Jean Alavoine (FRA)	Odile Defraye (BEL)
12	21 July	La Rochelle to Brest	470 km (290 mi)	Plain stage	Louis Heusghem (BEL)	Odile Defraye (BEL)
13	24 July	Brest to Cherbourg-en-Cotentin	405 km (252 mi)	Plain stage	Jean Alavoine (FRA)	Odile Defraye (BEL)
14	26 July	Cherbourg to Le Havre	361 km (224 mi)	Plain stage	Vicenzo Borgarello (ITA)	Odile Defraye (BEL)
15	28 July	Le Havre to Paris	317 km (197 mi)	Plain stage	Jean Alavoine (FRA)	Odile Defraye (BEL)
	Total		5,289 km (3,286 mi)			

=== General classification ===
Of the 131 starting cyclists, 41 finished. The winner received 5000 francs for his victory.

Final general classification (1–10)
Rank	Rider	Team	Points
1	Odile Defraye (BEL)	Alcyon	49
2	Eugène Christophe (FRA)	Armor	108
3	Gustave Garrigou (FRA)	Alcyon	140
4	Marcel Buysse (BEL)	Peugeot	147
5	Jean Alavoine (FRA)	Armor	148
6	Philippe Thys (BEL)	Peugeot	148
7	Hector Tiberghien (BEL)	Griffon	149
8	Henri Devroye (BEL)	Le Globe	163
9	Félicien Salmon (BEL)	Peugeot	166
10	Alfons Spiessens (BEL)	J.B. Louvet	167

Final general classification (11–41)
Rank	Rider	Sponsor	Points
11	Louis Heusghem (BEL)	Alcyon	167
12	René Vandenberghe (BEL)	Thomann	194
13	Vicenzo Borgarello (Italy)	J.B. Louvet	212
14	François Faber (LUX)	Automoto	229
15	Louis Engel (FRA)	Aiglon	241
16	Charles Deruyter (BEL)	Peugeot	255
17	Jacques Coomans (BEL)	Thomann	260
18	Firmin Lambot (BEL)	Le Globe	265
19	Ottavio Pratesi (Italy)	–	304
20	Charles Guyot (SUI)	Aiglon	309
21	Jules Deloffre (FRA)	–	320
22	Gabriel Figuet (FRA)	Griffon	335
23	Édouard Léonard (FRA)	J.B. Louvet	346
24	Eugène Dhers (FRA)	Automoto	354
25	Pierre-Joseph Heusghem (BEL)	Le Globe	358
26	Pierre Everaerts (BEL)	–	364
27	Julien Maitron (FRA)	Automoto	366
28	Henri Cornet (FRA)	Le Globe	398
29	François Lafourcade (FRA)	–	398
30	Augustin Ringeval (FRA)	–	408
31	Maurice Leliaert (BEL)	–	487
32	Georges Oudin (FRA)	–	494
33	Fernand Courcelles (FRA)	–	495
34	Raymond Harquet (FRA)	–	512
35	Emile Druz (FRA)	–	544
36	Emile Eigeldinger (FRA)	–	545
37	Charles Dumont (SUI)	–	546
38	Henri Alavoine (FRA)	–	577
39	Emile Caudrelier (FRA)	–	600
40	Gaston Neboux (FRA)	–	608
41	Maurice Lartigue (FRA)	–	612

=== Other classifications ===
Jules Deloffre, ranked 21 in the general classification, became the winner of the "isolés" category. The "isolés" classification was calculated in the same way as the general classification, but only with the stage results for the cyclists riding as isolated riders. Therefore, it was possible that Deloffre beat Pratesi with 41 points to 42 points in the isolés category, whereas Pratesi ranked higher in the general classification. The organising newspaper l'Auto named Odile Defraye the meilleur grimpeur. This unofficial title is the precursor to the mountains classification.

== Bibliography ==
- Amels, Wim (1984). De geschiedenis van de Tour de France 1903–1984 (in Dutch). Valkenswaard, Netherlands: Sport-Express. ISBN 978-90-70763-05-3.
- Augendre, Jacques (2016). "Guide historique" [Historical guide] (PDF). Tour de France (in French). Paris: Amaury Sport Organisation. Archived (PDF) from the original on 17 August 2016.
- Cleijne, Jan (2014). Legends of the Tour. London: Head of Zeus. ISBN 978-1-78185-998-8.
