= 1923 Giro di Lombardia =

Race details
- Dates: 27 October 1923
- Stages: 1
- Distance: 250 km (155.3 mi)
- Winning time: 9h 27' 35"

Results
	Winner	Giovanni Brunero (ITA)
	Second	Pietro Linari (ITA)
	Third	Federico Gay (ITA)

The 1923 Giro di Lombardia was the 19th edition of the Giro di Lombardia cycle race and was held on 27 October 1923. The race started and finished in Milan. The race was won by Giovanni Brunero of the Legnano team.

== General classification ==
Final general classification

Rank	Rider	Team	Time
1	Giovanni Brunero (ITA)	Legnano–Pirelli	9h 27' 35"
2	Pietro Linari (ITA)	Legnano–Pirelli	+ 18' 37"
3	Federico Gay (ITA)	Atala	+ 18' 37"
4	Ottavio Bottecchia (ITA)	Ganna	+ 18' 37"
5	Giovanni Trentarossi (ITA)	Berettini–Monza	+ 18' 37"
6	Livio Cattel (ITA)		+ 18' 37"
7	Pietro Bestetti (ITA)	Berettini–Monza	+ 18' 37"
8	Emilio Malacrida (ITA)		+ 18' 37"
9	Ermanno Vallazza (ITA)		+ 18' 37"
10	Giuseppe Enrici (ITA)	Legnano–Pirelli	+ 18' 37"
