= Giovanni Marchese =

Giovanni Marchese may refer to:

- Giovanni Marchese (footballer)
- Giovanni Marchese (cyclist)
- Giovanni Marchese di Provera, served in the Habsburg Austrian army in Italy during the French Revolutionary Wars
