= Pierre Herbette =

French cyclist (1887–1956)

Personal information
- Born: 24 October 1887 Bauné, France
- Died: 1 November 1956 (aged 69)
- Height: 1.66 m (5 ft 5 in)
- Weight: 80 kg (176 lb)

Cycling career
- Sport: Cycling
- Disciplines: Track; Road
- Role: Rider

Pierre Herbette (French pronunciation: [pjɛʁ ɛʁbɛt]; 24 October 1887 – 1 November 1956) was a French track and road racing cyclist.

== Career ==
=== Track cycling ===
During the 1910s Herbette was active as track cyclist. He notably competed among others at the ephemeral Vel'Doutre, a dismantlable velodrome set up annually in Angers between 1910 and 1914.

The Vel’Doutre, located in the Doutre district of Angers, was operational for three months each year and could accommodate up to 7,000 spectators. Despite its temporary nature, the track drew elite international cyclists and became a prestigious venue in early 20th-century European track cycling. Herbette was one of the main champions alongside notable contemporaries like Gabriel Poulain, Thorvald Ellegaard, Émile Friol and Victor Dupré. Events held at the Vel'Doutre included attempts at the hour record and the flying 1000 metres, disciplines in which Herbette took part during what is now considered a golden era of French track cycling.

His achievement are extensively described in the 2024 book A Angers-Doutre, le Vélodrome était en CDD (translated: In Angers-Doutre, the Vélodrome on a fixed-term contract).

=== Road cycling ===
From 1920 to 1924 he competed in many of the main international road cycling races, including the Tour de France, Paris–Tours and Paris–Roubaix. In 1920, he rode the Tour de France and finished 13th at 1920 Paris–Tours. In 1921 he finished 8th at the Paris–Tours. This edition is regarded as one of the toughest. The race of 342 kilometres took place in severe weather with snow-covered roads, taking him over 19 hours to complete the race.
