= Pietro Chesi =

Italian cyclist

Personal information
- Full name: Pietro Chesi
- Nickname: Pelo
- Born: 24 November 1902 Gambassi Terme, Italy
- Died: 15 August 1944 (aged 41) Florence, Italy

Cycling career
- Sport: Cycling
- Discipline: Road
- Role: Rider

Professional teams
- 1927: Nicolo Biondo
- 1928: Bianchi
- 1930: Morozzi

Major wins
- Milan–San Remo (1927)

Pietro Chesi (Italian pronunciation: [ˈpjɛːtro ˈkɛːzi]; 24 November 1902 – 15 August 1944) was an Italian cyclist.

He was a professional from 1925 to 1934 and won Milan–San Remo in 1927 with an attack on the Passo del Turchino. He left the favorite to win, Alfredo Binda, 9 minutes behind.

A supporter of Mussolini and a member of the Blackshirts, Chesi was captured by anti-fascist partisans, who later executed him.

== Major results ==
1926
6th Giro dell'Umbria
1927
1st Milan–San Remo
1928
6th Milan–San Remo
10th Overall Giro d'Italia
10th Overall Giro della Provincia di Reggio Calabria
