= 1913 Milan–San Remo =

Race details
- Dates: 30 March 1913
- Stages: 1
- Distance: 286.5 km (178.0 mi)
- Winning time: 9h 11' 58"

Results
	Winner	Odile Defraye (BEL)
	Second	Louis Mottiat (BEL)
	Third	Ezio Corlaita (ITA)

The 1913 Milan–San Remo was the seventh edition of the Milan–San Remo cycle race and was held on 30 March 1913. The race started in Milan and finished in San Remo. The race was won by Odile Defraye.

== General classification ==
Final general classification

Rank	Rider	Time
1	Odile Defraye (BEL)	9h 11' 58"
2	Louis Mottiat (BEL)	+ 0"
3	Ezio Corlaita (ITA)	+ 4' 08"
4	Angelo Gremo (ITA)	+ 4' 08"
5	Alfonso Calzolari (ITA)	+ 4' 08"
6	Jean Alavoine (FRA)	+ 17' 00"
7	Camillo Bertarelli (ITA)	+ 17' 04"
8	Angelo Erba (ITA)	+ 17' 24"
9	Gustave Garrigou (FRA)	+ 20' 55"
10	André Blaise (BEL)	+ 20' 55"
