= 1921 Giro d'Italia =

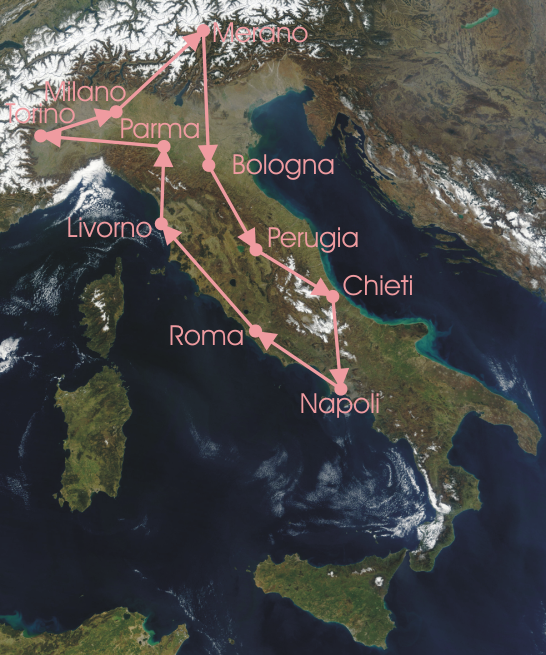
- Race Route

Race details
- Dates: 25 May – 12 June 1921
- Stages: 10
- Distance: 3,107 km (1,931 mi)
- Winning time: 120h 24' 39"

Results
	Winner	Giovanni Brunero (ITA)	(Legnano)
	Second	Gaetano Belloni (ITA)	(Bianchi)
	Third	Bartolomeo Aymo (ITA)	(Legnano)
	Team	Bianchi - Dunlop	

The 1921 Giro d'Italia was the ninth edition of the Giro d'Italia, a Grand Tour organized and sponsored by the newspaper La Gazzetta dello Sport. The race began on 25 May in Milan with a stage that stretched 333 km (207 mi) to Merano, finishing back in Milan on 12 June after a 305 km (190 mi) stage and a total distance covered of 3,107 km (1,931 mi). The race was won by the Italian rider Giovanni Brunero of the Legnano team. Second and third respectively were the Italian riders Gaetano Belloni and Bartolomeo Aymo.

During the 5th stage, on the "Altopiano delle Cinquemiglia" (in Abruzzo region), Girardengo suffered a legendary crisis: he got off his bike, drew a cross on the road and said: "Girardengo si ferma qui" (Girardengo stops here).

== Participants ==
Of the 69 riders that began the Giro d'Italia on 25 May, 27 of them made it to the finish in Milan on 12 June. Riders were allowed to ride on their own or as a member of a team. There were three teams that competed in the race: Bianchi-Dunlop, Legnano-Pirelli, and Stucchi-Pirelli.

The peloton was almost completely composed of Italians. The field featured two former Giro d'Italia champions in the three-time winner Carlo Galetti and 1919 winner Costante Girardengo. Other notable Italian riders that started the race included Bartolomeo Aymo, Angelo Gremo, Giovanni Rossignoli, and Giuseppe Santhià.

== Race summary ==
The first four stages ended in sprints, and all of them were won by Girardengo. Therefore, Girardengo was leading the general classification in the fifth stage, although he had the same time as Belloni who had finished together with him in all four stages. In that fifth stage, Girardengo fell. When Belloni noticed this, he attacked, and Girardengo was distanced. Girardengo chased for a long time, but he did not have any help from other riders, and was unable to get back. He decided to abandon the race.

Belloni won the fifth stage, and he became the new leader. He was only a few seconds ahead of the next rider, so the Giro was far from over.

In the seventh stage, Brunero finished solo, two minutes ahead of the next group. This was enough to put him in the lead. Brunero stayed close to Belloni in the other stages; Belloni won two more stages, but did not gain any time on Brunero. At the end of the Giro, Brunero won with a margin of 41 seconds, statistically one of the closest Giri ever.

== Final standings ==
=== Stage results ===
Stage results
Stage	Date	Course	Distance	Type (Note: In 1921, there was no distinction in the rules between plain stages and mountain stages; the icons shown here indicate that the first, third, fourth, fifth, sixth, eighth, and tenth stages included major mountains.)	Winner	Race Leader
1	25 May	Milan to Merano	333 km (207 mi)	Stage with mountain(s)	Costante Girardengo (ITA)	Costante Girardengo (ITA)
2	27 May	Merano to Bologna	348 km (216 mi)	Plain stage	Costante Girardengo (ITA)	Costante Girardengo (ITA)
3	29 May	Bologna to Perugia	321 km (199 mi)	Stage with mountain(s)	Costante Girardengo (ITA)	Costante Girardengo (ITA)
4	31 May	Perugia to Chieti	328 km (204 mi)	Stage with mountain(s)	Costante Girardengo (ITA)	Costante Girardengo (ITA)
5	2 June	Chieti to Naples	264 km (164 mi)	Stage with mountain(s)	Gaetano Belloni (ITA)	Gaetano Belloni (ITA)
6	4 June	Naples to Rome	299 km (186 mi)	Stage with mountain(s)	Luigi Annoni (ITA)	Gaetano Belloni (ITA)
7	6 June	Rome to Livorno	341 km (212 mi)	Plain stage	Giovanni Brunero (ITA)	Giovanni Brunero (ITA)
8	8 June	Livorno to Parma	242 km (150 mi)	Stage with mountain(s)	Luigi Annoni (ITA)	Giovanni Brunero (ITA)
9	10 June	Parma to Turin	320 km (199 mi)	Plain stage	Gaetano Belloni (ITA)	Giovanni Brunero (ITA)
10	12 June	Turin to Milan	305 km (190 mi)	Stage with mountain(s)	Gaetano Belloni (ITA)	Giovanni Brunero (ITA)
	Total		3,107 km (1,931 mi)			

=== General classification ===
There were 27 cyclists who had completed all ten stages. For these cyclists, the times they had needed in each stage was added up for the general classification. The cyclist with the least accumulated time was the winner.

Final general classification (1–10)
Rank	Name	Team	Time
1	Giovanni Brunero (ITA)	Legnano-Pirelli	120h 24' 39"
2	Gaetano Belloni (ITA)	Bianchi	+ 41"
3	Bartolomeo Aymo (ITA)	Legnano-Pirelli	+ 19' 47"
4	Lucien Buysse (BEL)	Bianchi	+ 39' 00"
5	Angelo Gremo (ITA)	Bianchi	+ 47' 28"
6	Federico Gay (ITA)	Bianchi	+ 59' 33"
7	Alfredo Sivocci (ITA)	Legnano-Pirelli	+ 1h 24' 27"
8	Clemente Canepari (ITA)	Legnano-Pirelli	+ 2h 24' 08"
9	Giovanni Rossignoli (ITA)	Bianchi	+ 2h 24' 25"
10	Luigi Annoni (ITA)	Stucchi	+ 2h 36' 57"

Final general classification (11–27)
Rank	Name	Team	Time
11	Alfredo Cominetti (ITA)	—	+ 3h 31' 24"
12	Giovanni Scaioni (ITA)	—	+ 3h 39' 44"
13	Nicola Di Biase (ITA)	—	+ 4h 16' 49"
14	Michele Gordini (ITA)	—	+ 5h 34' 50"
15	Giuseppe Santhià (ITA)	Bianchi	+ 6h 08' 49"
16	Lauro Bordin (ITA)	Bordin	+ 6h 35' 26"
17	Enrico Sala (ITA)	Ancora	+ 6h 46' 54"
18	Angelo Erba (ITA)	—	+ 6h 56' 04"
19	Louis Luguet (FRA)	Bianchi	+ 8h 39' 02"
20	Ugo Bianchi (ITA)	—	+ 10h 14' 16"
21	Rinaldo Spinelli (ITA)	—	+ 10h 14' 21"
22	Angelo Guidi (ITA)	—	+ 11h 35' 01"
23	Antonio Tecchio (ITA)	—	+ 11h 51' 37"
24	Damiano Solitario (ITA)	—	+ 13h 32' 29"
25	Luigi Sinchetto (ITA)	—	+ 13h 58' 27"
26	Felice Di Gaetano (ITA)	—	+ 14h 17' 30"
27	Andrea Cazzaniga (ITA)	—	+ 1d 2h 40' 01"

=== Other classifications ===
There were two other classifications contested at the race. A points classification was won Giovanni Brunero and a team classification was won by Bianchi-Dunlop. Giovanni Rossignoli won the prize for best ranked independent rider in the general classification.
