= 1925 Paris–Roubaix =

Cycling race

Race details
- Dates: 12 April 1925
- Stages: 1
- Distance: 260 km (161.6 mi)
- Winning time: 9h 16' 32"

Results
	Winner	Félix Sellier (BEL)
	Second	Pietro Bestetti (ITA)
	Third	Jules Van Hevel (BEL)

The 1925 Paris–Roubaix was the 26th edition of the Paris–Roubaix, a classic one-day cycle race in France. The single day event was held on 12 April 1925 and stretched 260 km (162 mi) from Paris to its end in a velodrome in Roubaix. The winner was Félix Sellier from Belgium.

== Results ==
Final results (1–10)
Rank	Cyclist	Time
1	Félix Sellier (BEL)	9h 16' 32″
2	Pietro Bestetti (ITA)	+0' 00″
3	Jules Van Hevel (BEL)	+0' 00″
4	Pietro Linari (ITA)	+0' 00″
5	Heiri Suter (SUI)	+0' 00″
6	Adelin Benoit (BEL)	+0' 00″
