= 1927 Milan–San Remo =

Race details
- Dates: 3 April 1927
- Stages: 1
- Distance: 286.5 km (178.0 mi)
- Winning time: 9h 43' 00"

Results
	Winner	Pietro Chesi (ITA)
	Second	Alfredo Binda (ITA)
	Third	Domenico Piemontesi (ITA)

The 1927 Milan–San Remo was the 20th edition of the Milan–San Remo and was held on 3 April. The winner was Pietro Chesi (Italy).

== General classification ==
Final general classification (1-10)
Rank	Rider	Time
1	Pietro Chesi (ITA)	9h 43' 00"
2	Alfredo Binda (ITA)	+ 9' 00"
3	Domenico Piemontesi (ITA)	+ 9' 00"
4	Arturo Bresciani (ITA)	+ 12' 00"
5	Heiri Suter (SUI)	+ 12' 00"
6	Antonio Negrini (ITA)	+ 12' 00"
7	Giuseppe Pancera (ITA)	+ 12' 00"
8	Federico Gay (ITA)	+ 12' 00"
9	Giovanni Brunero (ITA); Aristide Cavallini (ITA); Battista Giuntelli (ITA); Allegro Grandi (ITA); Mario Lusiani (ITA); Felix Manthey (GER); Egidio Picchiottino (ITA)	+ 12' 00"
