= 1921 Paris–Tours =

Race details
- Dates: 17 April 1921
- Stages: 1
- Distance: 342 km (212.5 mi)
- Winning time: 14h 56' 20"

Results
	Winner	Francis Pélissier (FRA)
	Second	Louis Mottiat (BEL)
	Third	Eugène Christophe (FRA)

The 1921 Paris–Tours was the 16th edition of the Paris–Tours cycle race and was held on 17 April 1921. The race started in Paris and finished in Tours and was won by Francis Pélissier. It has been considered one of the most difficult editions of the race due to both its length of 342 kilometres and the severe weather conditions snow covered roads, resulting in the winning time being almost 15 hours.

== General classification ==
Final general classification

Rank	Rider	Time
1	Francis Pélissier (FRA)	14h 56' 20"
2	Louis Mottiat (BEL)	+ 1' 32"
3	Eugène Christophe (FRA)	+ 1' 40"
4	Albert Dejonghe (BEL)	+ 9' 10"
5	Fernand Moulet (FRA)	+ 58' 40"
6	Louis Heusghem (BEL)	+ 1h 04' 40"
7	Joseph Muller (FRA)	+ 2h 44' 00"
8	Pierre Herbette (FRA)	+ 4h 21' 00"
