= Luigi Annoni =

Italian cyclist

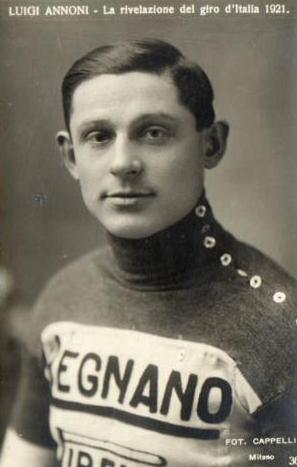

Personal information
- Born: 9 November 1890 Paderno Dugnano, Italy
- Died: 17 April 1974 (aged 83)

Cycling career
- Sport: Cycling
- Discipline: Road
- Role: Rider

Professional teams
- 1913–1921: Stucchi
- 1922: Legnano–Pirelli

Luigi Annoni (9 November 1890 – 17 April 1974) was an Italian racing cyclist. He won stages 6 and 8 of the 1921 Giro d'Italia and stage 8 of the 1922 Giro d'Italia.

== Major results ==
1913
4th Giro di Lombardia
1921
1st Stages 6 & 8 Giro d'Italia
1922
1st Stage 8 Giro d'Italia
10th Milan–San Remo
