= Maurice Lartigue =

French cyclist

Personal information
- Full name: Maurice Lartigue
- Born: 29 October 1890 Urt, France
- Died: 20 April 1956 (aged 65)

Cycling career
- Sport: Cycling
- Role: Rider

Maurice Lartigue (29 October 1890 – 20 April 1956) was a French racing cyclist. He finished in last place in the 1912 Tour de France. (Of the 131 starting cyclists, 41 finished.) He was the brother of photographer Jacques Henri Lartigue
