= Giovanni Marchese (cyclist) =

Italian cyclist (1889–1954)

Personal information
- Born: 30 November 1889 Verolengo, Italy
- Died: 13 November 1954 (aged 64) Turin, Italy

Cycling career
- Sport: Cycling
- Discipline: Road
- Role: Rider

Professional teams
- 1908: Individual
- 1909: Bianchi
- 1910: OTAV–Pirelli
- 1911–1918: Individual
- 1919: Verdi
- 1920–1921: Individual
- 1927: Individual

Giovanni Marchese (30 November 1889 – 13 November 1954) was an Italian professional road racing cyclist, active from 1908 to 1927.

== Career ==
Marchese was a prominent cyclist during the 1910s. He achieved his most notable result at the 1910 Milan–San Remo, finishing third. This edition is known among the toughest editions in history ever; due to severe snow and very cold and bad weather. Only Marchede and three others from the 64 cyclist who started, were able to reach the finish line.

He also competed in the Giro d'Italia, placing tenth overall in the 1909 edition and eighth overall in the 1910 edition. He raced both as an individual and with teams including Bianchi and OTAV. His career spanned before and after World War I, ending with a final appearance in 1927.

=== Grand Tour general classification results and major classic results ===
Stage races	1909	1910	1913	1919
Giro d'Italia	10th	8th	DNF	15th
Tour de France	DNF	—	—	—

Classic cycling races	1909	1910	1911	1912	1915	1918	1927
Milan–San Remo	30th	3rd	—	36th	17th	—	62nd
Giro di Lombardia	63rd	—	47th	—	—	13th	—
