= 1910 Milan–San Remo =

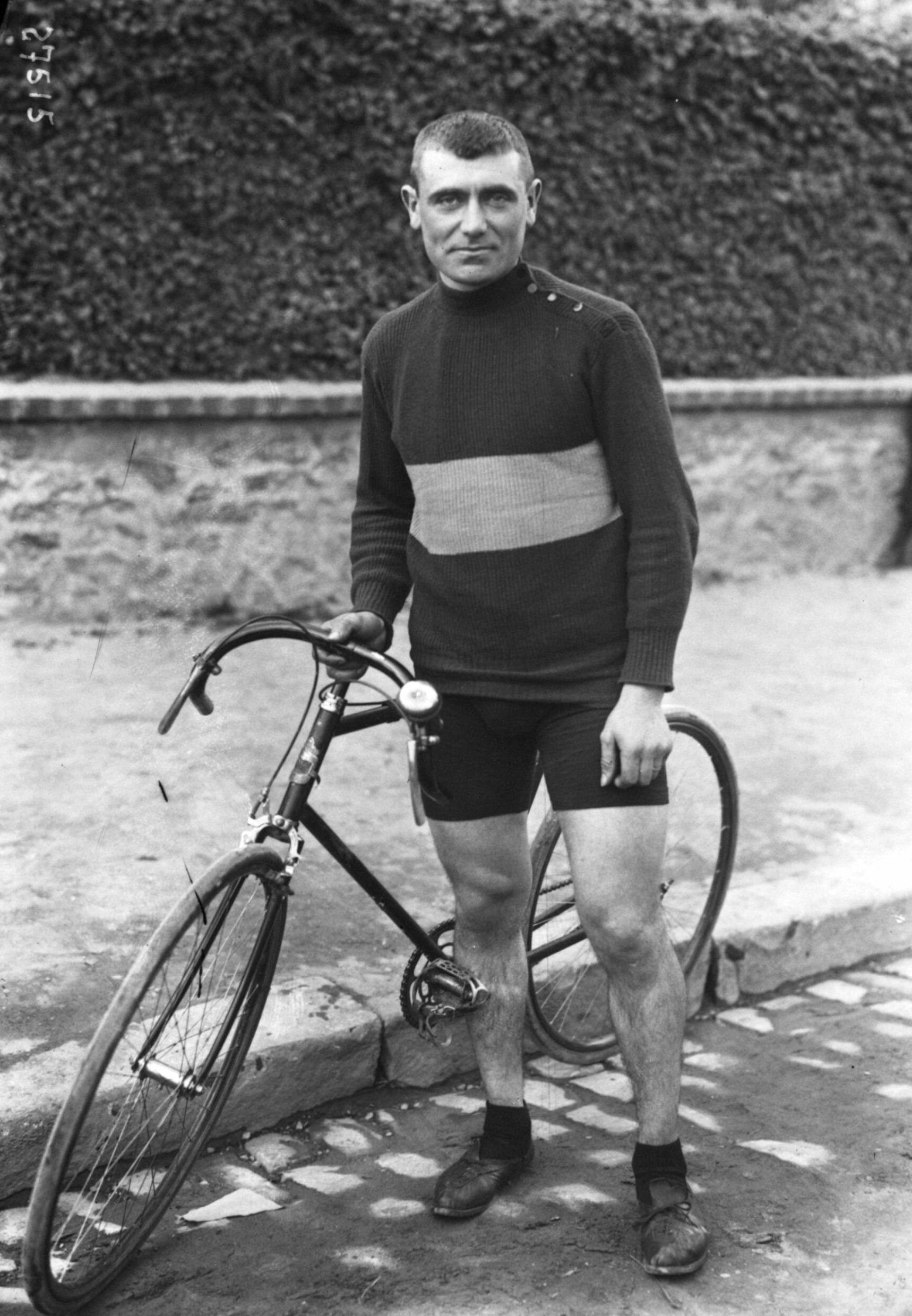
- Eugène Christophe won the fourth running of Milan–San Remo

Race details
- Dates: 3 April 1910
- Stages: 1
- Distance: 289.3 km (179.8 mi)
- Winning time: 12h 24' 00"

Results
	Winner	Eugène Christophe (France)	(Alcyon-Dunlop)
	Second	Giovanni Cocchi (Italy)	
	Third	Giovanni Marchese (Italy)	

The fourth running of the Milan–San Remo cycling race took place on 3 April 1910. Frenchman Eugène Christophe won the event, more than one hour ahead of his first pursuers. The race gained a place in cycling legend because it was run in dreadful weather. Riders needed to take refuge in the houses along the roads from a severe snowstorm. Only four of 63 riders finished the race.

== Summary ==
63 riders started the race in Milan at 6 a.m., when news broke that heavy snow fell on the Turchino, prompting some riders to return home immediately. Cyrille Van Hauwaert, winner of the 1908 race, broke away and had a 3-minute lead over Octave Lapize, Luigi Ganna and Ernest Paul when they reached Ovada. Eugène Christophe was in fifth place at 10 minutes.

As the weather deteriorated, only thirty riders were still in the race by Masone and were forced to walk and shoulder their bikes up the climb. At the top of the Turchino, after five hours of racing, Van Hauwaert was still in the lead, followed by Christophe at 10 minutes, Paul at 19 minutes and Ganna at 22. Van Hauwaert crashed in the snowy descent, sought refuge in a cottage and, when warmed up, refused to continue his way.

Meanwhile, Eugène Christophe, after being refreshed as well, continued his way in a pair of long pants, and set off in pursuit of the new leaders Pierino Albini and Luigi Ganna. By Savona Christophe had taken the lead, followed by Ganna at 15 minutes and Albini at 26. Christophe again stopped to eat and cut his pants that had become entangled in his chain.

Christophe won, even though he thought he had taken a wrong road and did not realize he was the first to reach Sanremo. Christophe finished the race in 12 hours and 24 minutes, the slowest in history. Luigi Ganna, the previous year's winner, finished second at 39' 30", but was disqualified for having taken a car.

After the race, Christophe needed to be hospitalized for frostbite to his hands and further body damage from the cold. He spent a month in a Sanremo hospital and it took another two years before he recovered to his original health.

== Results ==
	Rider	Team	Time
1	(France) Eugène Christophe	Alcyon-Dunlop	12h 24' 00"
2	(Italy) Giovanni Cocchi	-	+ 1h 01' 00"
3	(Italy) Giovanni Marchese	-	+ 1h 17' 00"
4	(Italy) Enrico Sala	Senior-Polack	+ 2h 06' 00"

Just four riders were officially listed. Two more riders reportedly finished after the classified four, but the officials had already gone home.
