= Eugène Christophe =

French cyclist

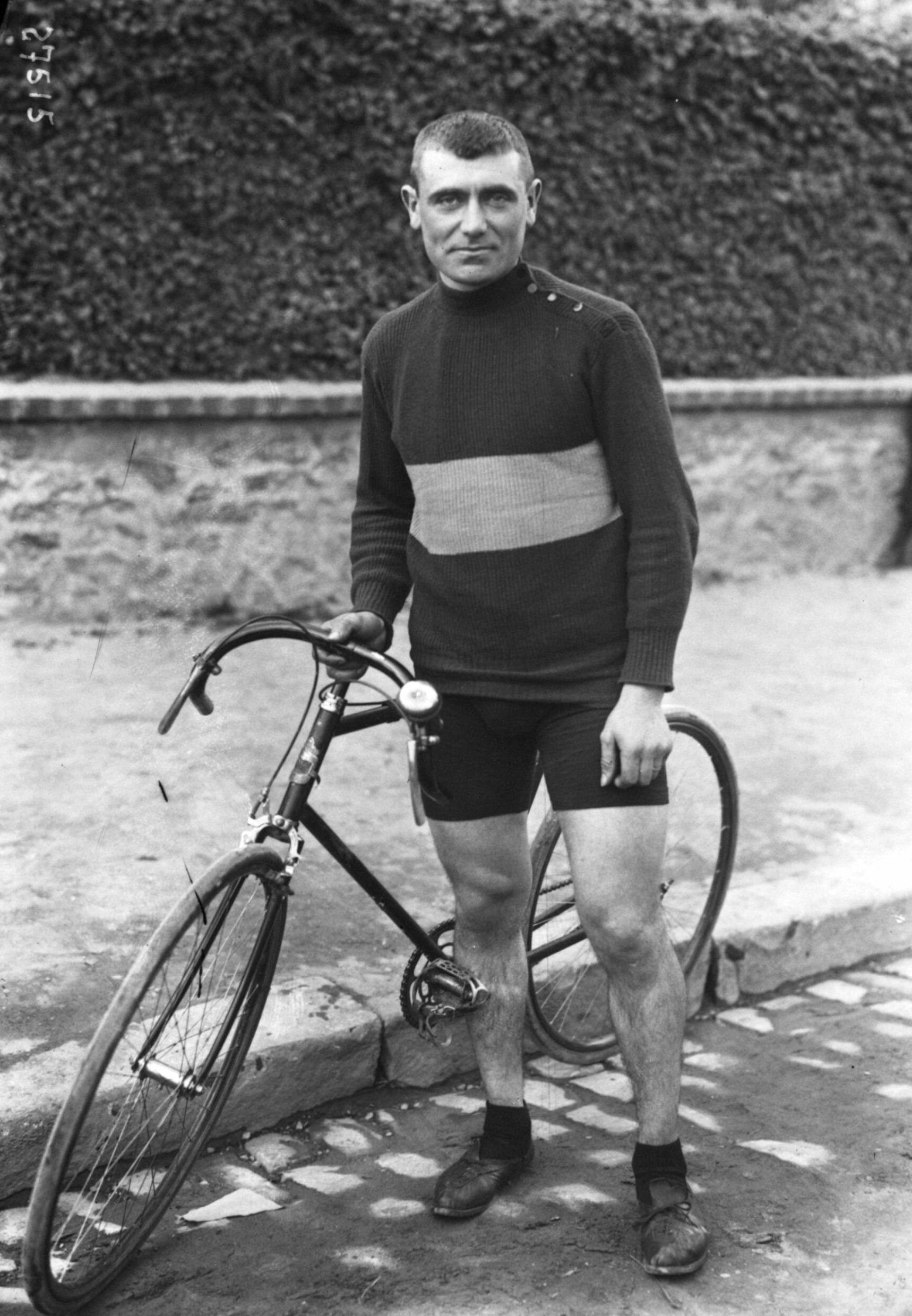

Personal information
- Full name: Eugène Christophe
- Nicknames: Cri-cri; Le vieux Gaulois (The old Gaul); Le serrurier de Malakoff (The Malakoff locksmith)
- Born: 22 January 1885 Paris, France
- Died: 1 February 1970 (aged 85) Paris, France

Cycling career
- Sport: Cycling
- Disciplines: Road and cyclo-cross
- Role: Rider

Professional teams
- 1904–1905: no information
- 1906: Labor
- 1907–1911: Alcyon
- 1912: 3 teams
- 1913–1914: Peugeot–Wolber
- 1914–1918: No information
- 1919–1921: La Sportive
- 1922: Automoto-Wolber-Russell
- 1923–1924: Christophe–Hutchinson
- 1925: JB Louvet
- 1926: Christophe–Hutchinson / Peugeot–Dunlop

Major wins
- Cyclo-cross National Championships Road Grand Tours Tour de France 3 individual stages (1912) One-day races and Classics Milan–San Remo (1910) Paris–Tours (1920) Bordeaux–Paris (1920, 1921)

Eugène Christophe (22 January 1885 – 1 February 1970) was a French road bicycle racer and pioneer of cyclo-cross. He was a professional from 1904 until 1926. In 1919 he became the first rider to wear the yellow jersey of the Tour de France.

Eugène Christophe rode 11 Tours de France and finished eight. He never won but he became famous for having to weld together his bicycle while leading. It was one of a series of events that coloured his racing career.

== Origins ==
Eugène Christophe rode his first race when he was 18 and his last when he was 41 in 1926. He worked as a locksmith until racing took over his life.

== Tour de France ==
=== The 1906 race ===
The 1906 Tour de France was Christophe's first. He finished in ninth place behind René Pottier.

=== The 1912 race ===
In the 1912 Tour de France Christophe was denied victory by the system of awarding victory to the winner on points. Throughout the race he was the strongest rider, but the Belgians rode together to win sprints to amass points. Only when Christophe could drop the peloton did he finish ahead of eventual winner Odile Defraye.

Christophe won three consecutive stages using this method (including the Tour's longest successful solo break of 315 km to Grenoble). Had the race been decided on time, the result would have been closer – Christophe would have led until the final stage, when he sat up in disgust allowing a group to ride away. As a result, the 1913 race reverted to a time-based classification.

=== 1913 and the Tourmalet incident ===
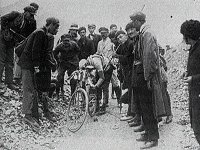
Eugène Christophe in trouble on the road

In 1913 Christophe was well placed to win when a mechanical failure cost him the race. He rode the first part, from Paris to Cherbourg and then down the coast to the Pyrenees cautiously. He was in second place when the race stopped in Bayonne on the night before the first day in the mountains, when the course featured a succession of cols: the Osquich, Aubisque, Soulor, Tourmalet, Aspin and Peyresourde. The field set off at 3am with Christophe 4m 5s behind Odile Defraye, of Belgium.

Christophe rode for Peugeot and his team attacked from the start to demoralise the rival Alcyon riders and, in particular, Defraye. It worked. Defraye was 11 minutes behind at Oloron-Ste-Marie, 14 in Eaux-Bonnes, 60 at Argelès. He dropped out at Barèges, at the foot of the Tourmalet, the highest pass in the Pyrenees. Christophe dropped all the field except another Belgian, Philippe Thys, who followed at a few hundred metres. Thys was of no danger, however, because he had lost too much time earlier. The two were five minutes ahead of the rest.

Christophe stopped at the top of the mountain, reversed his back wheel to pick a higher gear

Christophe said:

I plunged full speed towards the valley. According to Henri Desgrange's calculation, I was then heading the general classification with a lead of 18 minutes. So, I was going full speed. All of a sudden, about ten kilometres from Ste-Marie-de-Campan down in the valley, I feel that something is wrong with my handlebars. I cannot steer my bike any more. I pull on my brakes and I stop. I see my forks are broken. Well, I tell you now that my forks were broken but I wouldn't say it at the time because it was bad publicity for my sponsor.

And there I was left alone on the road. When I say the road, I should say the path. All the riders I had dropped during the climb soon caught me up. I was weeping with anger. I remember I heard my friend Petit-Breton shouting as he saw me, 'Ah, Cri-Cri, poor old lad.' I was getting angry. As I walked down, I was looking for a short cut. I thought maybe one of those pack trails would lead me straight to Ste-Marie-de-Campan. But I was weeping so badly that I couldn't see anything. With my bike on my shoulder, I walked for more than ten kilometres. On arriving in the village at Ste-Marie-de-Campan, I met a young girl who led me to the blacksmith on the other side of the village. His name was Monsieur Lecomte.

It took two hours to reach the forge. Lecomte offered to weld the broken forks back together but a race official and managers of rival teams would not allow it. A rider, said the rules, was responsible for his own repairs and outside assistance was prohibited. Christophe set about the repair as Lecomte told him what to do. It took three hours and the race judge penalised him 10 minutes – reduced later to three – because Christophe had allowed a seven-year-old boy, Corni, to pump the bellows for him. Filling his pockets with bread, Christophe set off over two more mountains and eventually finished the tour in seventh place. The building on the site of the forge has a plaque commemorating the episode.

The forks which cost Christophe the race were taken away by Peugeot. He didn't see them again until a dying man bequeathed them to him more than 30 years later. Some reports say that Christophe broke his forks because he ran into a car on the descent. The historian and author, Bill McGann, says:

I have found no mention of a car in Christophe's own retelling of the story. Broken forks were not unusual. I am sure that the poor state of 1913 metallurgy and bad mountain roads caused the disaster. My own theory, based on little information, is that the car story is probably a piece of Peugeot disinformation. It must have been awful for Peugeot to have their famous rider celebrated for having broken a fork. A car crash makes this all easy to explain. The final nail in the coffin of the story is that Christophe said 'I wouldn't have told you then because it was bad publicity for my firm.' If it had been a car crash, there would have been no bad publicity because no one expects a bike to withstand a car crash.

== First world war ==
Christophe became a soldier when France declared war in 1914. He served with a cycling battalion.

=== 1919 race and the yellow jersey ===
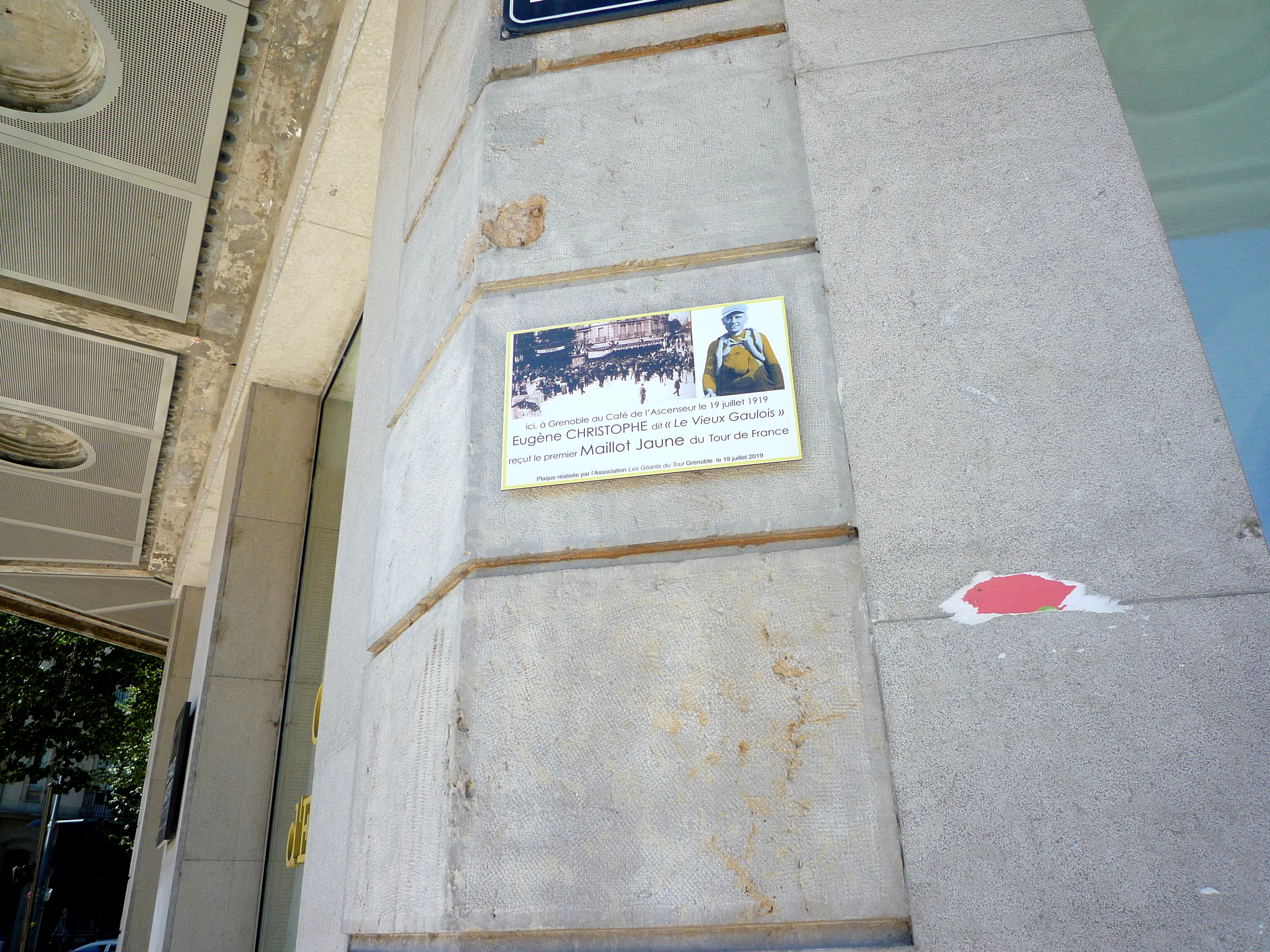
Plaque in the city of Grenoble, celebrating the centenary of the presentation of the first yellow jersey on 19 July 1919. (corner boulevard Gambetta and rue Beranger)

In 1919 Christophe became the first man to wear the yellow jersey of race leader, though he was destined not to win the race overall. Christophe was riding with a grey La Sportive jersey when, while leading, Desgrange gave him the first yellow jersey. Christophe said:

So soon after the war, the cycle industry was not yet in action again, and the only marque supplying material was La Sportive and there was little difference between any of the jerseys they supplied. One day – it was on the 482km stage from Les Sables d'Olonne to Bayonne – Monsieur Baugé, an official, remarked to Henri Desgrange that it was difficult enough for him to pick out the various riders and the public must find it impossible. Couldn't the race leader wear a special jersey?

However, Christophe was not at first pleased to wear the yellow jersey as he complained that the spectators laughed and told him that he looked like a canary.

By the start of the penultimate stage from Metz to Dunkirk, he was leading by 30 minutes. His fork broke again, this time on the cobbles of Valenciennes and, although being within a kilometre of the nearest forge, he lost more than two and a half hours and the race while he made repairs. On the final stage he had a run of punctures and dropped from second to third overall behind Jean Alavoine. His story captured the public imagination and he was awarded the same prize money as winner Firmin Lambot. His prize – 13,310 francs – came from a subscription opened by L'Auto, the paper which organised the race. Donations ranged from three francs to 500 given by Henri de Rothschild. It took 20 lists in the paper to name every donor.

Christophe kept the repaired forks in the basement of his home.

=== 1922 race and another broken fork ===
Placed in the top three and still in with a chance of overall victory, another broken fork on the descent of the Galibier in the Alps forced Christophe to once more walk out of the mountain on foot.

=== The 1925 race ===
The 1925 Tour was Christophe's last. He was 40 and finished 18th, 19 years after first riding the race. The anecdote of the race was that the Belgian, Émile Masson, was so tired from long and repeated days of racing that he asked Christophe to punch him in the face to wake him up.

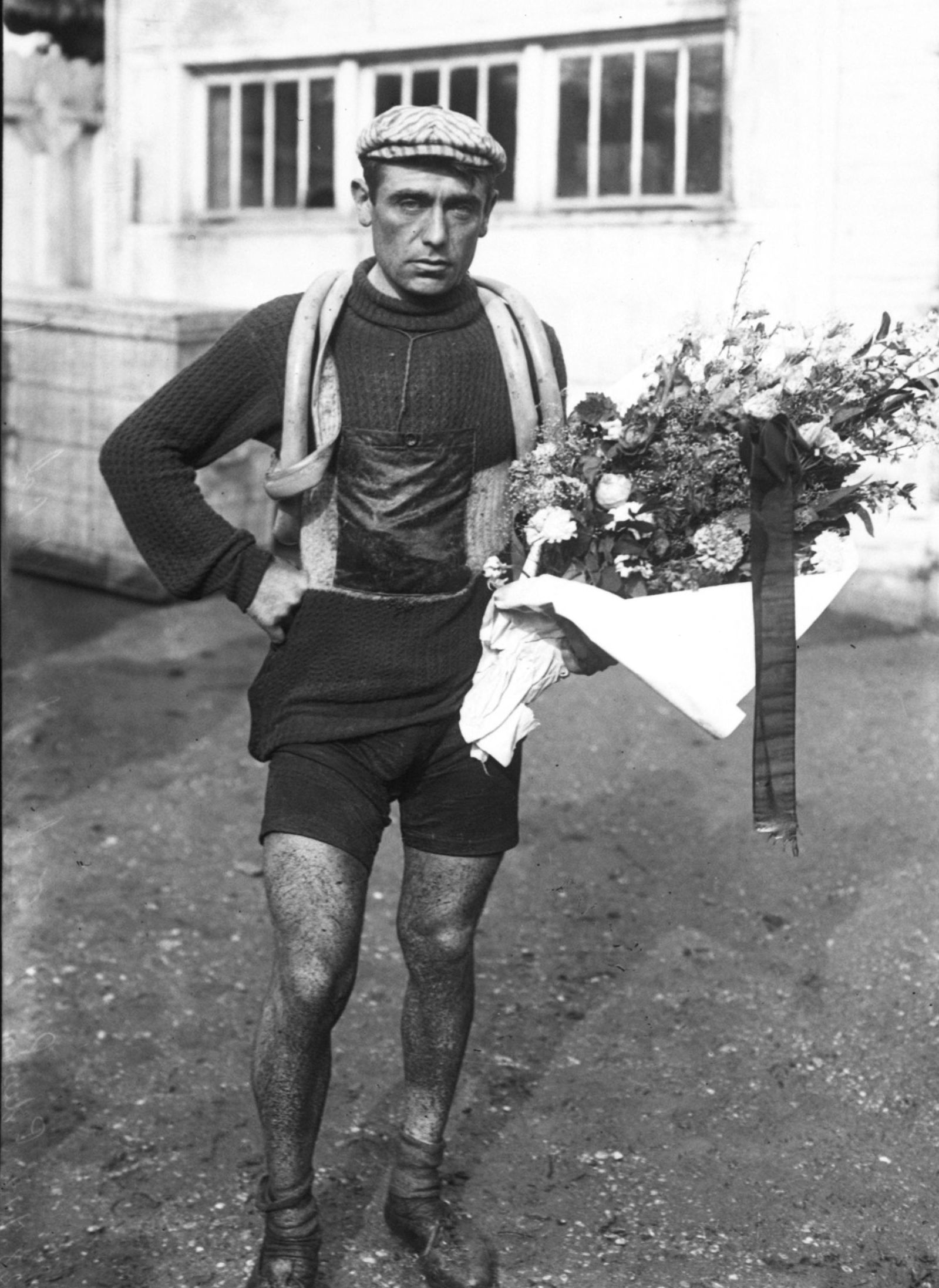
Christophe after finishing the 1912 Tour de France.

== Commemoration ==
The French cycling federation in 1951 placed a plaque on the wall of the building that stands now where the forge once stood at Ste-Marie-de-Campan. Christophe, then 66, re-enacted the day that cost him the Tour de France. He carried his bike on his shoulder, the front wheel in his hand, to the forge. There, wearing race clothes, he played out the way he had repaired his forks. With him were the judge who supervised him that day, and Corni, who as an 11-year-old had helped pump the fire. They were joined by Mme Despiau, the first woman Christope met on entering the village.

The plaque on the wall read:

Here, in 1913, Eugène Christophe, French racing cyclist, first in the general classification of the Tour de France, victim of a mechanical accident on the Tourmalet, repaired the fork of his bicycle at the forge. Having covered numerous kilometres by foot, in the mountains, and having lost numerous hours, Eugène Cristophe didn't abandon the race that he should have won, showing a sublime example of willpower. Gift of the Fédération Française de Cyclisme "under the patronage of L'Équipe.

Christophe's name was spelled the second time, as shown, with a missing H. The plaque stayed there until 2003, when it was replaced to mark the 100th anniversary of the Tour.

In 1965, Radio Luxembourg held a party to mark Christophe's 80th birthday. The station announced that he was cycling to the station from Malakoff and, jokingly, said anyone seeing a tiny old man riding a heavy bike through Paris should give him a wave: it would be Eugène Christophe. By the time Christophe reached the studio, he was in a cortège of 100 cycling fans, among them the former world champion, Georges Speicher.

The square at Ste-Marie-de-Campan, and a make of toe-clips, are named after him.

== 1910 Milan–San Remo ==
Christophe is most famous for the broken forks of the Tour de France, but his suffering was far greater in the 1910 edition of Milan–San Remo which was run in dreadful weather with glacial temperatures. There were 71 riders at the start; only four finished in San Remo. Christophe recounted:

The weather had been good at the start of the week but it turned really bad and Alphonse Baugé [the manager] told us that we'd be going over the Turchino even though the road was bad and covered with snow. François Faber and Louis Trousselier cheered us up by saying 'What does it matter if we've got Lapize and Christophe the two cyclo-cross champions with us?'

The roads were muddy and frozen and we had to bounce along in the ruts, riding on the verges between the posts that were spaced every 20 metres as far as Pavia. We rode the first 32km in 56 minutes, the 53km from Milan to Voghera in 1h 50. There were attacks after attack and it was more like a course des primes than a long-distance race...

We go to the notorious col de Turchino. The clouds were low, the countryside was unattractive and we started to feel the cold more and more. We started to shiver and every turn of the pedals was heavier. The half-melted snow made the race very hard and we were struggling too with a glacial wind. I dropped my friend Ernest Paul to get up to Ganna, whom I could see on the hairpins. I got up and past him without too much trouble because he didn't seem to be standing the cold any better than I was. Not far from the summit I had to get off my bike because I started feeling bad. My fingers were rigid, my feet numb, my legs stiff and I was shaking continuously. I began walking and running to get my circulation back, looking at the countryside. It was bleak and the wind made a low moaning noise. I'd have felt scared if I hadn't been used to bad weather in cyclo-crosses.

Well, I got back on my bike and I got to the top of the col. There's a tunnel at the top and I asked a soigneur how far down I was on the leader. He told me six minutes. I found van Hauwaert at the exit of the tunnel with his bike in his hand and a cloak on his back. He told me he was packing it in. I was beyond feeling happy about it and I just got on with going down through the snow that lay on the road on that side of the mountain.

The view was totally different now. The snow made the countryside beautiful. The sky was really clear. But now it was my turn to have trouble. It was hard to keep going. In places there were 20cm of snow and sometimes more. Each time I was obliged to get off and push. It was cyclo-cross – off, on, riding, walking. I could keep going but it was slowing me right down. Then I had to stop with stomach cramp. Doubled up, one hand on my bike and the other on my stomach, I collapsed on to a rock on the left side of the road. I was bitter with cold. All I could do was move my head a little from left to right and right to left.

I saw a little house not far away but I couldn't get there. I didn't realise just what danger I was in. I just had one thought: to get to San Remo first and I attached no importance to the pain I felt… I thought too of my contract with the bike factory. I'd get double my wages if I won as well as primes and there'd be my 300 francs for first place. Happily in my misfortune a man chanced to pass by.

' Signor, signor…'

Christophe looked at the man and said casa [house]. He took him into the house, undressed him and wrapped him in a blanket. Christophe did physical exercises to get his blood restarted. Then van Hauwaert and Paul came in. "They were so frozen that they put their hands into the flames. Ernest Paul had lost a shoe without noticing", Christophe said.

I was there for about 25 minutes. I saw four riders go by, or at least four piles of mud. I decided to press on. Ernest Paul said 'You're crazy.' And the innkeeper didn't want to let me go. I had to trick him by saying I could meet someone who would get me to San Remo by train. I set off and caught Cocchi and Pavesi and I got to the control just behind Ganna, who was setting off as I stopped. I set off again after Baugé told me I could win and I passed Ganna at the edge of the town. And I caught Albini a few kilometres later.

At the control at Savona (90km) everybody was astonished to see me alone. I didn't stop long and took Trousellier's spare bike, because I knew he and Garrigou had abandoned before Ovada. I was sure of my victory and with only 100km to go I felt a new strength. The idea of crossing the line alone brought back all my energy. I got to San Remo well behind the scheduled time. It was 6pm when I stopped underneath the blowing banner that showed the end of my Calvary.

It took a month in hospital for Christophe to recover from frostbite to his hands and the damage the cold had done to his body. It was another two years before he got back to his original health. Only three riders finished and the result is still uncertain because some reports say van Hauwaert came fourth and others that he was disqualified for hanging on to a car.

== Cyclo-cross ==
Christophe was national cyclo-cross champion from 1909 to 1914, then again in 1921.

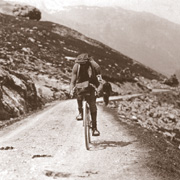
Christophe climbing the Col du Galibier at the 1912 Tour de France.

== Personality ==
Christophe was a short and methodical man who raced with a 20 franc coin, a 10 franc coin, a chain link and a spoke key in a chamois bag hung round his neck. The journalist Jock Wadley, who visited him at Malakoff, said: "M. Christophe had a tidy mind. That is why his workshop is tidy, with every tool clean and in its place. His home is equally in order. I had merely to mention some subject and he would go to a drawer, take out an envelope or a file, marked 'Tour 1912' or 'Paris–Roubaix 1920' or ' cross-cyclo pédèstre '. Every photograph had a neatly written caption on the back."

His race diary dated from the start of the 1920s. A neat, small hand described every race, stage by stage, his impressions, results and expenses. Christophe said that every night in the race hotel he laid out his kit like a fireman, "so that the moment I was called in the morning I didn't waste time looking for my clothes and equipment. Shoes, jersey, goggles, shorts and the rest of it were laid out neatly."

Wadley added:

He said not the first time during my visit that he was not a rich man in the monetary sense but had a wealth of happy memories and good health to show from his racing exertions. He still rides a lot, is at most of the touring rallies in the Parisian area, but likes to take it easy. 'I have suffered enough on a vélo,' he said, but last year he did 115 miles in 8½ hours, with 12lb of luggage, stopping 10 minutes every two hours to eat biscuits, pears and grapes and drink a glass of Vichy water.

== Death ==
Eugène Christophe died in the Hôpital Broussais in Paris. He lived in Malakoff, near Paris, all his life. He was a member of the L'Étoile Sportive de Malakoff cycling club from his first races until his death. Jacques Anquetil awarded him the Tour de France medal at the end of the 1965 race. Christophe was 81.

== Reputation ==
Christophe never won the Tour, but his stories have become part of the race's mythology. Christophe (like René Vietto and Raymond Poulidor after him) is celebrated as an eternal second, more famous for his near-misses than his more successful rivals.

== Major results ==
1904
7th Paris–Roubaix
1906
4th Paris–Tours
9th Overall Tour de France
1909
1st National CX Championships
6th Giro di Lombardia
9th Overall Tour de France
1910
1st National CX Championships
1st Milan–San Remo
3rd Paris–Roubaix
1911
1st National CX Championships
2nd Overall Tour of Belgium
6th Milan–San Remo
1912
1st National CX Championships
2nd Overall Tour de France

1st Stages 3, 4 & 5
Held after Stages 3–5

4th Overall Tour of Belgium
1913
1st National CX Championships
7th Overall Tour de France
8th Bordeaux–Paris
1914
1st National CX Championships
1917
3rd Paris–Tours
1919
3rd Overall Tour de France
6th Bordeaux–Paris
8th Paris–Tours
9th Paris–Roubaix
1920
1st Paris–Tours
1st Bordeaux–Paris
2nd Paris–Roubaix
1921
1st National CX Championships
1st Bordeaux–Paris
2nd Paris–Brest–Paris
3rd Paris–Tours
1922
4th Paris–Tours
4th Bordeaux–Paris
8th Overall Tour de France
