= 1920 Paris–Tours =

Race details
- Dates: 2 May 1920
- Stages: 1
- Distance: 342 km (212.5 mi)
- Winning time: 13h 22' 30"

Results
	Winner	Eugène Christophe (FRA)
	Second	Honoré Barthélémy (FRA)
	Third	Albert Dejonghe (BEL)

The 1920 Paris–Tours was the 15th edition of the Paris–Tours cycle race and was held on 2 May 1920. The race started in Paris and finished in Tours. The race was won by Eugène Christophe.

== General classification ==
Final general classification

Rank	Rider	Time
1	Eugène Christophe (FRA)	13h 22' 30"
2	Honoré Barthélémy (FRA)	+ 15' 04"
3	Albert Dejonghe (BEL)	+ 18' 02"
4	Charles Juseret (BEL)	+ 26' 30"
5	Jean Rossius (BEL)	+ 49' 30"
6	Jules Masselis (BEL)	+ 49' 30"
7	Romain Bellenger (FRA)	+ 1h 19' 30"
8	René Vermandel (BEL)	+ 1h 19' 30"
9	Joseph Van Daele (BEL)	+ 1h 19' 30"
10	Alfred Steux (BEL)	+ 1h 32' 30"
