= Angelo Guidi =

Italian cyclist

Personal information
- Born: 29 January 1888
- Died: 15 November 1953 (aged 65)

Cycling career
- Sport: Cycling
- Discipline: Road
- Role: Rider

Angelo Guidi (29 January 1888 – 15 November 1953) was an Italian racing cyclist. He rode in the 1924 Tour de France.
