= Vincenzo Borgarello =

Italian cyclist

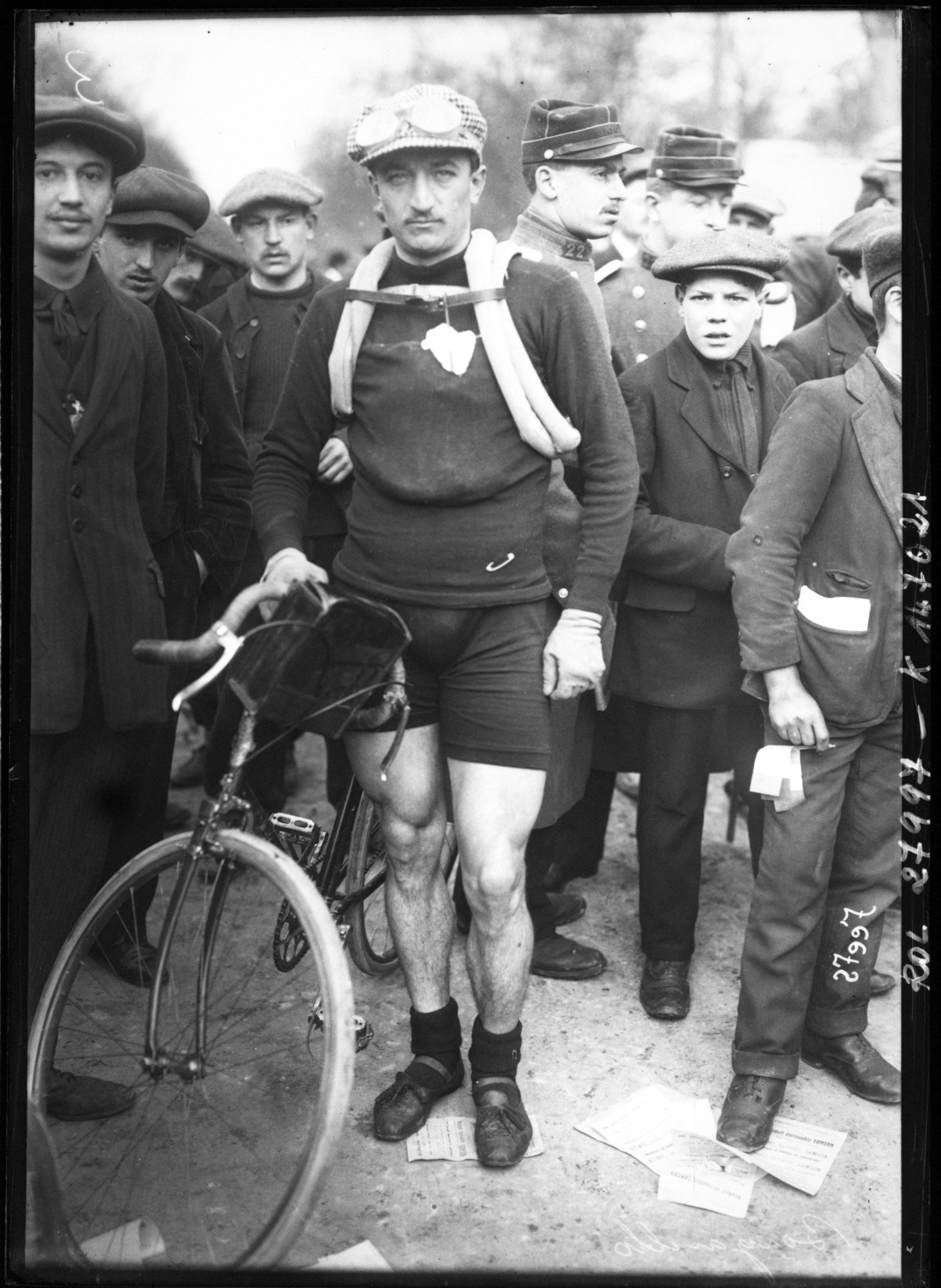

Personal information
- Full name: Vincenzo Borgarello
- Born: 9 May 1884 Cambiano, Italy
- Died: 17 June 1960 (aged 76) Turin, Italy

Cycling career
- Sport: Cycling
- Discipline: Road
- Role: Rider

Major wins
- Grand Tours Tour de France 2 individual stages (1912) Giro d'Italia 4 individual stages (1911, 1912) One-day races and Classics Giro del Piemonte (1910)

Vicenzo Borgarello (9 May 1884, in Cambiano, Piedmont – 17 June 1960) was an Italian professional road bicycle racer.

Borgarello was born in Cambiano and died in Turin. He won in total four stages in the Giro d'Italia and two stages in the Tour de France. He was leading the classification in the 1912 Tour de France for one day.

== Major results ==
1910
Giro del Piemonte
1911
Giro d'Italia:

Winner stage 2

1912
Giro d'Italia:

Winner stages 2, 7 and 9

Tour de France:

Winner stages 8 and 14
