= Louis Engel =

French cyclist

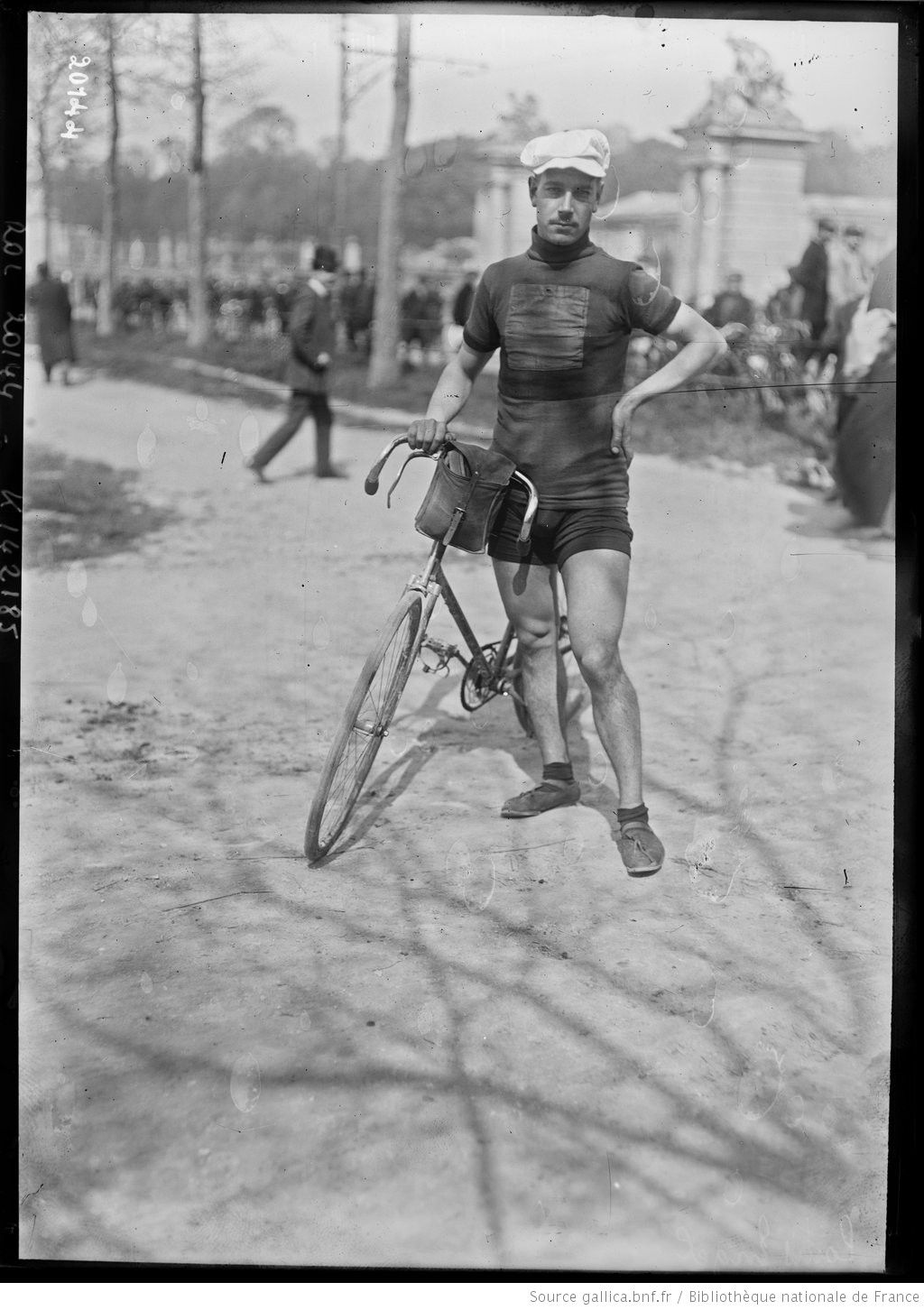

Personal information
- Born: 20 February 1885
- Died: 3 October 1960 (aged 69)

Cycling career
- Sport: Cycling
- Role: Rider

Louis Engel (20 February 1885 – 3 October 1960) was a French racing cyclist. He rode in the 1919 Tour de France.
