= Bartolomeo Aimo =

Italian cyclist

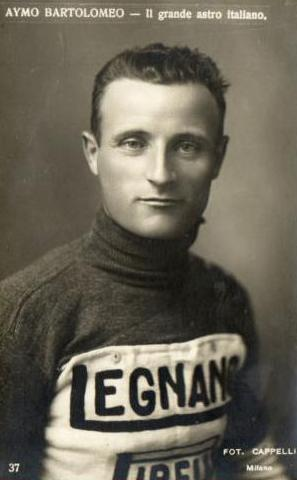

Personal information
- Full name: Bartolomeo Aimo
- Nickname: Bartù
- Born: 24 September 1889 Virle Piemonte, Italy
- Died: 1 December 1970 (aged 81) Turin, Italy

Cycling career
- Sport: Cycling
- Discipline: Road
- Role: Rider

Bartolomeo Aimo (sometimes written Bartolomeo Aymo (Virle Piemonte, 24 September 1889 — Turin, 1 December 1970) was an Italian professional road bicycle racer. He finished on the podium of the Giro d'Italia four times (1921, 1922, 1923, 1928) and on the podium of the Tour de France two times (1925, 1926) but never won a grand tour.

Aimo was the inspiration for a character in Ernest Hemingway's novel A Farewell to Arms. Hemingway, who served as an ambulance driver on the Italian-Austrian front during World War I, was known for incorporating real-life figures into his fiction, and Aimo was one of them.

Hemingway had a lifelong obsession with sports and physical activities, always striving to master them. He became an expert in bullfighting in Spain in the 1920s, developed a passion for big-game fishing in the 1930s in Key West, and pursued boxing, shooting, and hunting throughout his life. It is perhaps no surprise that during his time in Europe, he also developed a detailed knowledge of cycling. His friend and fellow writer John Dos Passos once remarked:

"Hem knew all the statistics and the names and lives of the riders."

While the fictional Aimo dies tragically as a young soldier, the real Bartolomeo Aimo lived a long life, dying in Turin on December 1, 1970, at the age of 81.

== Major results ==
1921
Giro d'Italia:

3rd place overall classification

Tour des Alpes Apuanes
1922
Giro d'Italia:

Winner stages 5 and 9
2nd place overall classification

1923
Giro d'Italia:

Winner stage 2
3rd place overall classification

Giro del Piemonte
1924
Giro d'Italia:

Winner stage 1

Tour de France:

4th place overall classification

1925
Tour de France:

Winner stage 13
3rd place overall classification

1926
Tour de France:

Winner stage 14
3rd place overall classification

1928
Giro d'Italia:

3rd place overall classification
