= Odile Defraye =

Belgian cyclist

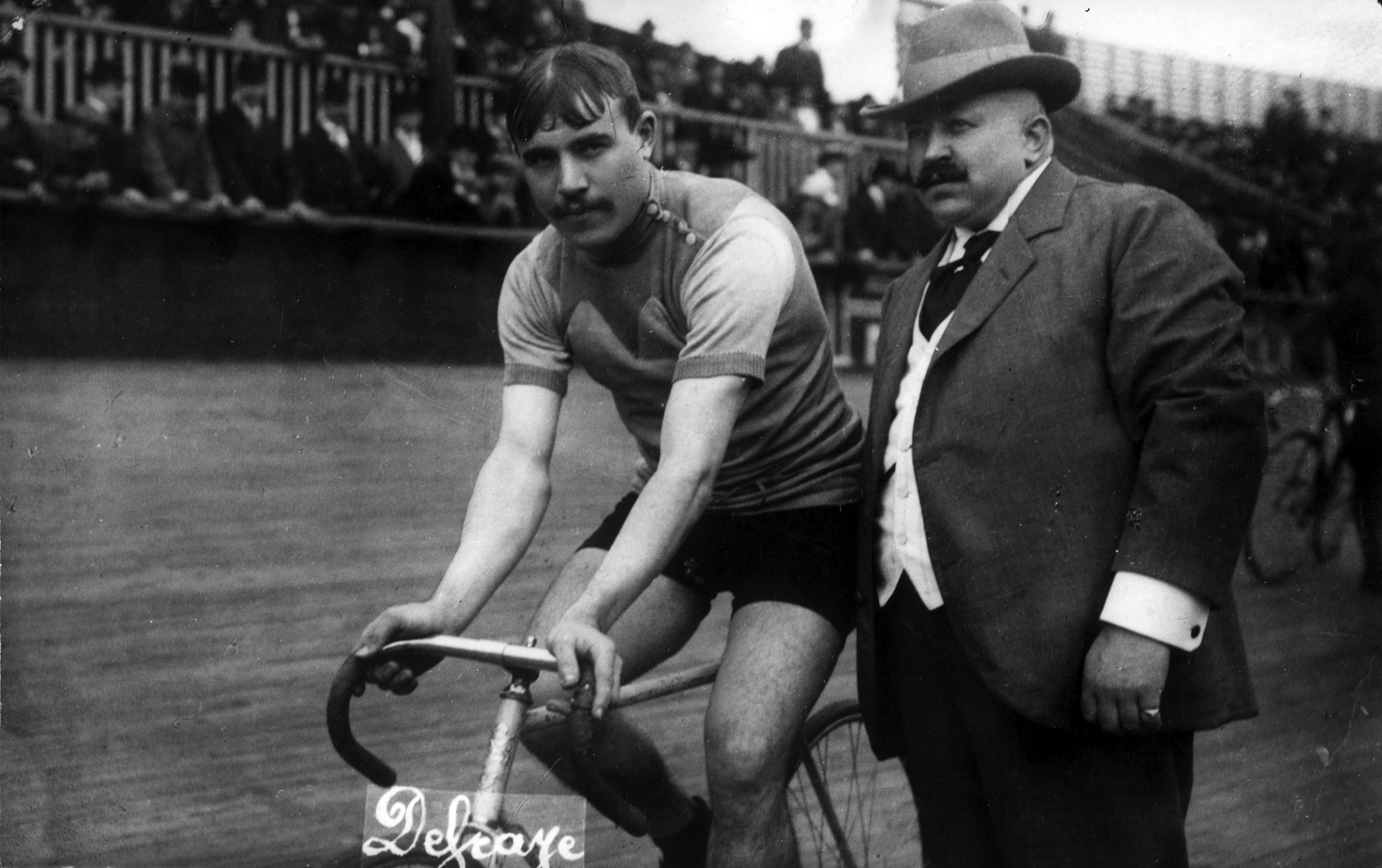

Personal information
- Full name: Odile Defraye
- Born: 14 July 1888 Rumbeke, West Flanders, Belgium
- Died: 21 August 1965 (aged 77) Walloon Brabant, Belgium

Cycling career
- Sport: Cycling
- Discipline: Road
- Role: Rider

Major wins
- Grand Tours Tour de France General classification (1912) Mountains classification (1912) 3 individual stages (1912) Stage races Tour of Belgium (1912) One-day races and Classics National Road Race Championships (1911) Milan–San Remo (1913) Kampioenschap van Vlaanderen (1910)

Odile Defraye (pronounced [ɔ.dil dɛ.fʁɛj]; Dutch: Odiel Defraeye; 14 July 1888 – 21 August 1965) was a Belgian road racing cyclist who won three stages and the overall title of the 1912 Tour de France, which was the last tour decided by a points system instead of overall best time. He was the first Belgian to win the Tour and was only invited to join Alcyon's all-French team at a late stage for publicity purposes.

In the 1913 Tour de France, Defraye held the overall lead after stages 2 through 5 before relinquishing the lead on the Tourmalet to Stage 6 and eventual winner Philippe Thys. He participated in six tours between 1909 and 1924 but his victory Tour was the only one that he completed.

Other major wins include the 1913 Milan–San Remo, a one-day classic, and four stages and the overall for the 1912 Tour of Belgium.

== Career achievements ==
=== Major results ===
1908
1st Tour of Flanders (Amateur edition)
1910
1st Kampioenschap van Vlaanderen
1911
1st National Road Championships - Road race
1912
Winner Tour de France

1st Stages 2, 7 & 9

Winner Tour of Belgium

1st Stages 2, 3, 6 & 7

3rd l'Étoile Carolorégienne
5th Paris-Roubaix
1913
1st Milan–San Remo
1914
Tour of Belgium

Stage 6

1921
Tour of Belgium

Stage 6

=== Grand Tour results timeline ===
	1909	1910	1911	1912	1913	1914	1915	1916	1917	1918	1919	1920	1921	1922	1923	1924
Giro d'Italia	DNE	DNE	DNE	DNE	DNE	DNE	N/A	N/A	N/A	N/A	DNE	DNE	DNE	DNE	DNE	DNE
Stages won	—	—	—	—	—	—	N/A	N/A	N/A	N/A	—	—	—	—	—	—
Tour de France	DNF-2	DNE	DNE	1	DNF-6	DNF-10	N/A	N/A	N/A	N/A	DNF-4	DNF-3	DNE	DNE	DNE	DNF-6
Stages won	0	0	0	3	0	0	N/A	N/A	N/A	N/A	0	0	—	—	—	0
Vuelta a España	N/A	N/A	N/A	N/A	N/A	N/A	N/A	N/A	N/A	N/A	N/A	N/A	N/A	N/A	N/A	N/A
Stages won	N/A	N/A	N/A	N/A	N/A	N/A	N/A	N/A	N/A	N/A	N/A	N/A	N/A	N/A	N/A	N/A

Legend
1	Winner
2–3	Top three-finish
4–10	Top ten-finish
11–	Other finish
DNE	Did not enter
DNF-x	Did not finish (retired on stage x)
DNS-x	Did not start (not started on stage x)
HD-x	Finished outside time limit (occurred on stage x)
DSQ	Disqualified
N/A	Race/classification not held
NR	Not ranked in this classification
