= Charles Deruyter =

Belgian cyclist

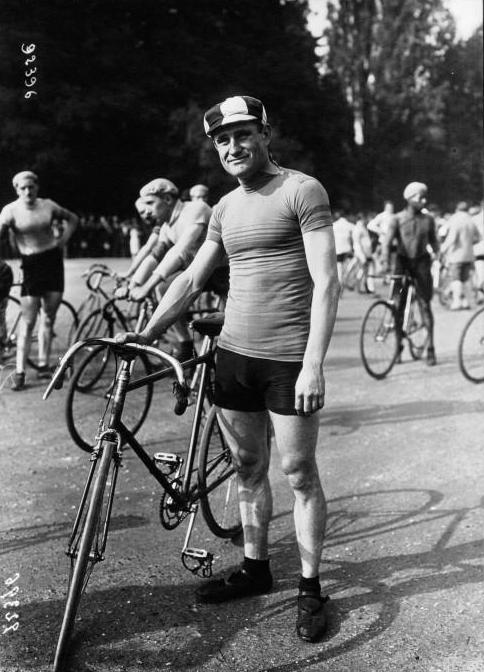
- Deruyter in 1921

Personal information
- Born: 27 January 1890 Wattrelos, Nord-Pas de Calais, France
- Died: 24 January 1955 (aged 64) Saint-Servais, Namur, Wallonia, Belgium

Cycling career
- Sport: Cycling

Professional teams
- 1912-1913: Peugeot
- 1923: Gurtner-Hutchinson

Charles Deruyter (27 January 1890 – 24 January 1955) was a Belgian professional road and track racing cyclist. His best results on the road included second place in the 1913 Paris–Roubaix and the 1923 Tour of Flanders, and winning the only edition of the Circuit des Champs de Bataille held as a stage race, in 1919.
