= Giovanni Brunero =

Italian cyclist

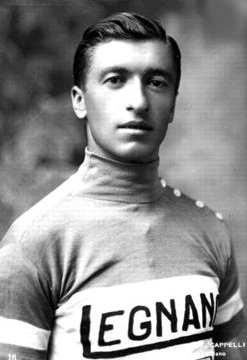

Personal information
- Full name: Giovanni Giuseppe Brunero
- Born: 4 October 1895 San Maurizio Canavese, Italy
- Died: 23 November 1934 (aged 39) Cirié, Italy

Cycling career
- Sport: Cycling
- Discipline: Road
- Role: Rider

Professional teams
- 1919–1927: Legnano
- 1928: Wolsit-Pirelli/Legnano
- 1929: Legnano

Major wins
- Grand Tours Tour de France 1 individual stage (1924) Giro d'Italia General classification (1921, 1922, 1926) 6 individual stages (1921, 1922, 1925, 1926, 1927) One-day races and Classics Milan–San Remo (1922) Giro di Lombardia (1923, 1924)

Giovanni Giuseppe Brunero (10 April 1895 – 23 November 1934) was an Italian professional road racing cyclist.

== Biography ==
Giovanni Brunero was born in San Maurizio Canavese. He became a professional in 1920, coming fifth in Milan–San Remo. In the same year he was Italian junior champion, second at the Giro di Lombardia and he won the Giro dell'Emilia, beating Gaetano Belloni and Costante Girardengo.

In the 1920s he was one of the dominant racers in the Giro d'Italia, with victories in 1921, 1922, and 1926. His other victories include Milan–San Remo (1922) and two Giri di Lombardia (1923–1924).

He died in Cirié in 1934.

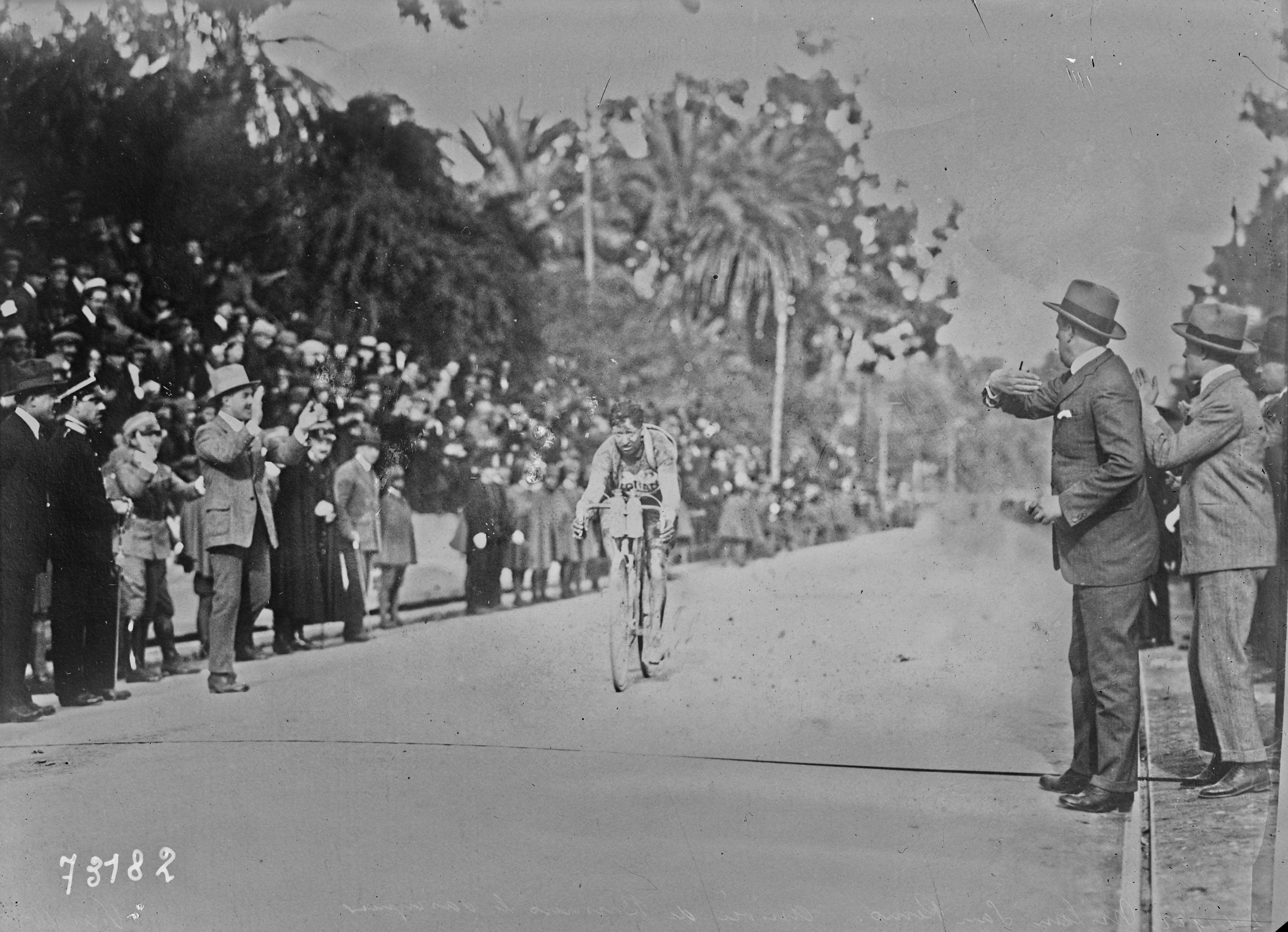
Brunero arriving at the 1922 Milan-San Remo

== Major results ==
1920
1st Giro dell'Emilia
2nd Giro di Lombardia
1921
1st Overall Giro d'Italia

1st Stage 7

1st Giro del Piemonte
1922
1st Overall Giro d'Italia

1st Stage 7 & 10

1st Milan–San Remo
1923
1st Giro di Lombardia
1st Giro della Romagna
1924
1st Giro di Lombardia
1st Stage 10 Tour de France
1925
3rd Overall Giro d'Italia

1st Stage 8

1926
1st Overall Giro d'Italia

1st Stage 8

1927
2nd Overall Giro d'Italia

1st Stage 13
