= Pietro Bestetti =

Italian cyclist

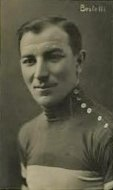

Personal information
- Born: 2 December 1898 Pioltello, Italy
- Died: 3 January 1936 (aged 37) Milan, Italy

Cycling career
- Sport: Cycling

Pietro Bestetti (2 December 1898 – 3 January 1936) was an Italian cyclist. He competed in two events at the 1920 Summer Olympics. He finished in second place in the 1925 Paris–Roubaix and rode in four editions of the Giro d'Italia in the 1920s.
