= Pietro Linari =

Italian cyclist

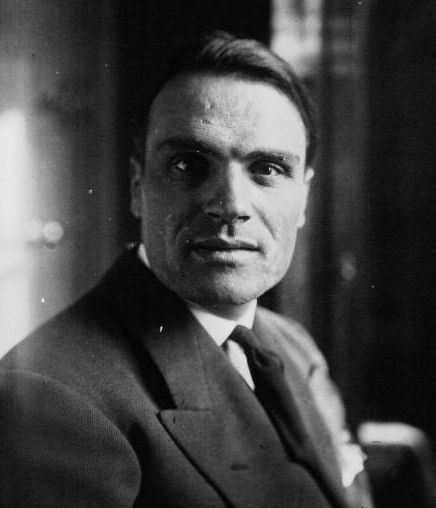
Pietro Linari

Pietro Linari (15 October 1896 – 1 January 1972) was an Italian cyclist. He finished in fourth place in the 1925 Paris–Roubaix.
