= List of cyclists in the 1920 Tour de France =

List of cyclists

There were 138 cyclists registered for the race, of which 113 started the first stage of the 1920 Tour de France. 31 of those were in the first class, the other 82 in the second class. Favourites were Christophe, Mottiat, Thys, Belloni, Alavoine and Henri Pelissier.

== By starting number ==
Legend
No.	Starting number worn by the rider during the Tour
Pos.	Position in the general classification
DNF	Denotes a rider who did not finish

No.	Name	Nationality	Pos.	Ref
1	Eugène Christophe	France	DNF	
2	Firmin Lambot	Belgium	3	
3	Honoré Barthélémy	France	8	
4	Henri Pélissier	France	DNF	
5	Francis Pélissier	France	DNF	
6	Louis Heusghem	Belgium	6	
7	Odile Defraye	Belgium	DNF	
8	Joseph Van Daele	Belgium	10	
9	Jacques Coomans	Belgium	DNF	
10	Louis Mottiat	Belgium	DNF	
11	Jean Rossius	Belgium	7	
12	Alfred Steux	Belgium	DNF	
13	Léon Scieur	Belgium	4	
14	Émile Masson	Belgium	5	
15	Philippe Thys	Belgium	1	
16	Albert Dejonghe	Belgium	DNF	
17	Marcel Godard	France	DNF	
18	Romain Bellenger	France	DNF	
19	Charles Juseret	Belgium	DNF	
20	Hector Tiberghien	Belgium	DNF	
22	Jules Masselis	Belgium	DNF	
23	Robert Jacquinot	France	DNF	
24	Félix Goethals	France	9	
25	Robert Gerbaud	France	DNF	
26	Gaetano Belloni	Italy	DNF	
27	Angelo Gremo	Italy	DNF	
28	Jean Alavoine	France	DNF	
30	Hector Heusghem	Belgium	2	
31	René Chassot	France	DNF	
32	Eugène Dhers	France	11	
33	Urbain Anseeuw	Belgium	DNF	
101	Didier Meslard	France	DNF	
102	Joseph Tomasso	France	DNF	
103	Pierre Herbette	France	DNF	
105	François Chevalier	France	DNF	
108	Adrien Alpini	France	DNF	
109	Charles Pavese	France	DNF	
110	Henri Ory	France	DNF	
111	Ange-Marie Aubry	France	DNF	
112	Etienne Dorfeuille	France	19	
113	Alexandre Gilles	France	DNF	
114	Henri Catelan	France	DNF	
115	Guillaume Cecherelli	France	17	
116	Emile Costard	France	DNF	
117	Gaston Bohin	France	DNF	
118	Joseph Muller	France	15	
119	Paul Chevalier	France	DNF	
120	Emile Ledran	France	DNF	
121	Gustave Ganay	France	DNF	
122	Georges Dubuse	France	DNF	
123	Edmond Painault	France	DNF	
124	Ahmed Brazzi	France	DNF	
126	Antonio Guillermo	Spain	DNF	
127	Martin Bernard	France	DNF	
128	Napoléon Paoli	France	DNF	
129	Charles Cento	France	DNF	
130	Paul Thondoux	France	DNF	
132	José Nat	France	DNF	
133	Alfred Donnadieu	France	DNF	
134	Arthur Claerhout	Belgium	DNF	
135	Charles Loew	France	DNF	
136	Jules Dubois	France	DNF	
137	Roger Labric	France	DNF	
138	Charles Raboisson	France	22	
139	Julien Samyn	France	DNF	
140	Albert Desimpelaere	Belgium	DNF	
141	Achille Serroen	Belgium	DNF	
143	Marius Matheron	France	18	
144	Camille Mathieu	France	DNF	
145	José Pelletier	France	12	
150	Fernand Moulet	France	DNF	
151	Marcel Benel	France	DNF	
152	Robert Asse	France	DNF	
154	René Paxion	France	DNF	
155	Charles Van Bree	Belgium	DNF	
156	Pierre Excoffier	France	DNF	
157	Jules Nempon	France	DNF	
158	Fernand Sellier	Belgium	DNF	
160	Albert Heux	France	DNF	
161	Henri Ferrara	France	16	
162	Noël Amenc	France	14	
163	Mathieu Caplat	France	DNF	
164	Joseph Normand	France	DNF	
165	Félix Sellier	Belgium	DNF	
166	Jules Deloffre	France	DNF	
167	André Martin	France	DNF	
169	François Vannuytsel	Belgium	DNF	
170	Théophile Beeckman	France	DNF	
173	Théodore Abada	France	DNF	
175	Édouard Léonard	France	DNF	
176	Henri Leclerc	France	DNF	
177	Firmin Pauloin	France	DNF	
179	Eugène Colin	France	DNF	
180	Bertrand Alignon	France	DNF	
181	Arthur Godart	France	DNF	
182	Camille Botté	Belgium	DNF	
183	Louis Thuayre	France	DNF	
184	Julien Loisel	France	DNF	
185	Léon Van Aken	Belgium	DNF	
186	Maurice Van Cayzeelle	Belgium	DNF	
187	René Tissier	France	DNF	
188	Pierre Hudsyn	Belgium	20	
189	Jaime Janer	Spain	DNF	
190	André Coutte	France	21	
191	Maurice Lampaert	Belgium	DNF	
192	Henri Devroye	Belgium	DNF	
196	Léon Kopp	France	DNF	
197	Alfred Mottard	Belgium	DNF	
199	François Beths	Belgium	DNF	
200	Charles Van Mol	Belgium	DNF	
201	Theodore Wynsdau	Belgium	13	
203	Arthur Van Branteghem	Belgium	DNF	
204	Alfons Van Hecke	Belgium	DNF	
