= List of cyclists in the 1919 Tour de France =

List of cyclists

Three former winners of the Tour, François Faber, Octave Lapize and Lucien Petit-Breton had died fighting in World War I. Two other former winners, Philippe Thys and Odile Defraye started the race. The war had been only over for seven months, so most cyclists did not have a chance to train enough for the Tour. For that reason, there were almost no new younger cyclists, and the older cyclists dominated the race.

== By starting number ==
Legend
No.	Starting number worn by the rider during the Tour
Pos.	Position in the general classification
DNF	Denotes a rider who did not finish

No.	Name	Nationality	Pos.	Ref
1	René Gerwig	France	DNF	
3	Robert Asse	France	DNF	
4	François Chevalier	France	DNF	
6	Gaston Van Waesberghe	Belgium	DNF	
7	Constant Ménager	France	DNF	
15	Philippe Thys	Belgium	DNF	
19	Luigi Lucotti	Italy	7	
25	Marcel Buysse	Belgium	DNF	
26	Lucien Buysse	Belgium	DNF	
37	Henri Pélissier	France	DNF	
38	Alexis Michiels	Belgium	DNF	
39	Hector Tiberghien	Belgium	DNF	
40	Émile Masson	Belgium	DNF	
41	Jean Rossius	Belgium	DNF	
42	Jean Alavoine	France	2	
43	Louis Heusghem	Belgium	DNF	
44	Paul Duboc	France	DNF	
45	Firmin Lambot	Belgium	1	
46	Eugène Christophe	France	3	
47	René Vandenhove	France	DNF	
48	Louis Mottiat	Belgium	DNF	
49	Honoré Barthélémy	France	5	
50	Odile Defraye	Belgium	DNF	
51	Francis Pélissier	France	DNF	
52	Alfons Spiessens	Belgium	DNF	
53	Charles Juseret	Belgium	DNF	
54	Jules Masselis	Belgium	DNF	
55	Joseph Van Daele	Belgium	8	
56	Alfred Steux	Belgium	9	
57	Léon Scieur	Belgium	4	
58	Louis Engel	France	DNF	
59	Félix Goethals	France	DNF	
60	Robert Jacquinot	France	DNF	
61	René Chassot	France	DNF	
62	Hector Heusghem	Belgium	DNF	
63	Jacques Coomans	Belgium	6	
65	Albert Dejonghe	Belgium	DNF	
66	Urbain Anseeuw	Belgium	DNF	
67	Eugène Dhers	France	DNF	
68	Basiel Matthys	Belgium	DNF	
69	André Huret	France	DNF	
70	Charles Hans	France	DNF	
72	Joseph Verdickt	Belgium	DNF	
101	Pietro Fasoli	Italy	DNF	
102	Maurice Borel	France	DNF	
103	Henri Leclerc	France	DNF	
104	Edgard Roy	France	DNF	
105	André Renard	France	DNF	
106	Etienne Nain	France	DNF	
107	Emile Denys	France	DNF	
108	Jean Deyries	France	DNF	
113	Alfred Brailly	France	DNF	
114	Camille Van Marcke	Belgium	DNF	
115	José Orduna	Spain	DNF	
119	Maurice Bissiere	France	DNF	
120	Lucien Decour	France	DNF	
123	Léon Kopp	Belgium	DNF	
125	Emile Ledran	France	DNF	
131	Napoléon Paoli	France	DNF	
133	Albert Heux	France	DNF	
137	Ernest Gery	France	DNF	
138	Paul Blenck	France	DNF	
143	Paul Thondoux	France	DNF	
149	Henri Allard	Belgium	DNF	
151	Jules Nempon	France	10	
152	Henri Moreillon	France	DNF	
155	Aloïs Verstraeten	Belgium	DNF	
