= List of teams and cyclists in the 1914 Tour de France =

Philippe Thys, who had won the 1913 Tour de France, returned for the 1914 Tour de France and was considered as the favourite, together with his teammate Henri Pélissier. Apart from him six other previous Tour de France winners started the race: Louis Trousselier, Lucien Petit-Breton, Octave Lapize, François Faber, Odile Defraye and Gustave Garrigou. Four more cyclists started the race that would later win a Tour de France: Firmin Lambot, Léon Scieur, Henri Pélissier and Lucien Buysse. This number of 11 former or future Tour de France winners on the start line is a record. In addition, Italian champion Costante Girardengo, started the race, but Girardengo was not yet the champion from 1919 on, and was not the team leader. In 1914, the first cyclists from Australia started the Tour de France, Don Kirkham and Iddo Munro. They also finished the race, in 17th place and 20th place.

== Cyclists ==
=== By starting number ===
Legend
No.	Starting number worn by the rider during the Tour
Pos.	Position in the general classification
DNF	Denotes a rider who did not finish

No.	Name	Nationality	Team	Pos.	Ref
1	Marcel Buysse	Belgium	Alcyon–Soly	DNF	
2	Lucien Buysse	Belgium	Alcyon–Soly	DNF	
3	Odile Defraye	Belgium	Alcyon–Soly	DNF	
4	Paul Deman	Belgium	Alcyon–Soly	DNF	
5	Jean Rossius	Belgium	Alcyon–Soly	4	
6	Joseph Verdickt	Belgium	Alcyon–Soly	DNF	
7	Louis Mottiat	Belgium	Alcyon–Soly	DNF	
8	Dieudonné Gauthy	Belgium	Alcyon–Soly	DNF	
9	François Faber	Luxembourg	Peugeot–Wolber	9	
10	Gustave Garrigou	France	Peugeot–Wolber	5	
11	Émile Georget	France	Peugeot–Wolber	6	
12	Émile Engel	France	Peugeot–Wolber	DNF	
13	Oscar Egg	Switzerland	Peugeot–Wolber	13	
14	Eugène Christophe	France	Peugeot–Wolber	11	
15	Philippe Thys	Belgium	Peugeot–Wolber	1	
16	Jean Alavoine	France	Peugeot–Wolber	3	
17	Firmin Lambot	Belgium	Peugeot–Wolber	8	
18	Henri Pélissier	France	Peugeot–Wolber	2	
19	Louis Heusghem	Belgium	Peugeot–Wolber	10	
20	Marcel Baumler	France	Peugeot–Wolber	29	
21	Lucien Mazan	France	Automoto–Continental	DNF	
22	Costante Girardengo	Italy	Automoto–Continental	DNF	
23	Louis Luguet	France	Automoto–Continental	DNF	
24	Angelo Gremo	Italy	Automoto–Continental	DNF	
25	Giuseppe Contesini	Italy	Automoto–Continental	DNF	
26	Gaston Degy	France	Automoto–Continental	40	
27	Paul Duboc	France	Automoto–Continental	31	
28	Louis Trousselier	France	Automoto–Continental	38	
29	André Blaise	Belgium	Automoto–Continental	DNF	
30	Victor Doms	Belgium	Automoto–Continental	DNF	
31	Maurice Brocco	France	Gladiator–Dunlop	23	
32	Marcel Godivier	France	Gladiator–Dunlop	30	
33	Constant Ménager	France	Gladiator–Dunlop	34	
34	Charles Cruchon	France	Gladiator–Dunlop	35	
35	Charles Kippert	France	Gladiator–Dunlop	45	
36	Hector Tiberghien	Belgium	Delage–Continental	18	
37	Louis Engel	France	Delage–Continental	42	
38	Ernest Paul	France	Delage–Continental	12	
39	Louis Petitjean	Belgium	Delage–Continental	26	
40	Charles Charron	France	Delage–Continental	21	
41	Henri Devroye	Belgium	Armor–Soly	22	
42	Vincenzo Borgarello	Italy	Clément–Dunlop	25	
43	Giuseppe Santhià	Italy	Clément–Dunlop	DNF	
44	Marius Auriaux	France	Clément–Dunlop	DNF	
45	Maurice Dejoie	France	Clément–Dunlop	DNF	
47	Georges Passerieu	France	Phebus–Dunlop	DNF	
48	Don Kirkham	Australia	Phebus–Dunlop	17	
49	Iddo Munro	Australia	Phebus–Dunlop	20	
50	René Vandenberghe	Belgium	JB Louvet–Continental	28	
51	Alfons Spiessens	Belgium	JB Louvet–Continental	7	
52	Édouard Léonard	France	JB Louvet–Continental	DNF	
53	Eugène Dhers	France	JB Louvet–Continental	DNF	
54	Pietro Fasoli	Italy	JB Louvet–Continental	DNF	
55	Jules Nempon	France	JB Louvet–Continental	27	
56	Auguste Benoît	Belgium	JB Louvet–Continental	DNF	
57	Camillo Bertarelli	Italy	Alleluia–Continental	37	
58	Henri Lignon	France	Alleluia–Continental	DNF	
59	Raymond Harquet	France	Alleluia–Continental	41	
60	Angelo Erba	Italy	Alleluia–Continental	16	
61	Emile Wirtz	France	Alleluia–Continental	DNF	
62	Gaston Ducerisier	France	Alleluia–Continental	DNF	
64	Charles Crupelandt	France	La Française–Hutchinson	DNF	
65	Octave Lapize	France	La Française–Hutchinson	DNF	
66	Georges Monseur	Belgium	La Française–Hutchinson	DNF	
67	Pierre Vuge	France	La Française–Hutchinson	DNF	
68	Omer Verschoore	Belgium	La Française–Hutchinson	DNF	
69	Georges Tribouillard	France	La Française–Hutchinson	DNF	
70	Léon Scieur	Belgium	Thomann–Soly	14	
71	Jacques Coomans	Belgium	Thomann–Soly	19	
101	Albert Macon	France	Lone rider	DNF	
102	Camille Van Marcke	Belgium	Lone rider	DNF	
103	Louis Bonino	France	Lone rider	DNF	
104	Henri Alavoine	France	Lone rider	52	
105	Auguste Pierron	France	Lone rider	DNF	
106	Eugène Heninger	Switzerland	Lone rider	DNF	
107	Marcel Perrière	Switzerland	Lone rider	DNF	
108	Charles Raboisson	France	Lone rider	DNF	
109	Maurice Leliaert	Belgium	Lone rider	DNF	
110	Adrien Alpini	France	Lone rider	39	
111	Camille Mathieu	France	Lone rider	DNF	
112	Celidonio Morini	Switzerland	Lone rider	DNF	
113	Charles Dumont	Switzerland	Lone rider	46	
114	Marcel Rottie	France	Lone rider	53	
116	Alcide Rivière	France	Lone rider	DNF	
118	Georges Lips	France	Lone rider	DNF	
119	René Dourdon	France	Lone rider	DNF	
120	Henri Pépin	France	Lone rider	DNF	
121	André Coutte	France	Lone rider	DNF	
122	Pierre Stabat	France	Lone rider	DNF	
123	Emile Guyon	Switzerland	Lone rider	43	
124	Jules Deloffre	France	Lone rider	36	
125	Ali Neffati	Tunisia	Lone rider	DNF	
126	Paul Noterman	France	Lone rider	DNF	
127	Auguste Garnier	France	Lone rider	DNF	
128	Lucien Meunier	France	Lone rider	DNF	
129	Joanny Panel	France	Lone rider	DNF	
130	Auguste Rossignol	France	Lone rider	DNF	
131	Henri Hostalier	France	Lone rider	DNF	
132	François Flandin	France	Lone rider	DNF	
133	Gaston Van Waesberghe	Belgium	Lone rider	DNF	
134	Giovanni Micheletto	Italy	Lone rider	DNF	
135	René Cottrel	France	Lone rider	47	
136	Henri Tavernier	France	Lone rider	DNF	
138	Henri Leclerc	France	Lone rider	54	
139	Alexandre Gervais	France	Lone rider	DNF	
140	Maurice Rossi	France	Lone rider	DNF	
141	Henry Allard	Belgium	Lone rider	51	
142	André Cottard	France	Lone rider	DNF	
143	Georges Ducom	France	Lone rider	DNF	
144	Henri Viatoux	France	Lone rider	DNF	
145	Paul Boillat	Switzerland	Lone rider	DNF	
146	Felix Pregnac	France	Lone rider	DNF	
149	Giovanni Casetta	Italy	Lone rider	DNF	
151	Camille Botté	Belgium	Lone rider	15	
152	Florent Desanthoine	Belgium	Lone rider	DNF	
153	Marc Mesnard	France	Lone rider	DNF	
154	Pierre Everaerts	Belgium	Lone rider	32	
155	Séraphin Morel	France	Lone rider	DNF	
156	Julien Gabory	France	Lone rider	DNF	
157	Yves Quideau	France	Lone rider	DNF	
158	Louis Ferrault	France	Lone rider	DNF	
159	Louis Villemus	France	Lone rider	DNF	
160	Gaetano Caravaglia	Italy	Lone rider	DNF	
161	Eduardo Cuchetti	Italy	Lone rider	49	
164	Georges Nemo	Belgium	Lone rider	DNF	
165	Gaston Neboux	France	Lone rider	50	
166	Achiel De Smet	Belgium	Lone rider	DNF	
167	Charles Guyot	Switzerland	Lone rider	DNF	
168	Alfred Faure	France	Lone rider	DNF	
169	Jean Delafaille	Belgium	Lone rider	DNF	
171	Etienne Repette	France	Lone rider	DNF	
173	Julien Tuytten	Belgium	Lone rider	24	
174	Joseph Cassiers	Belgium	Lone rider	DNF	
175	Marcel Allain	France	Lone rider	DNF	
176	Hilleret	France	Lone rider	DNF	
177	Emile Lachaise	France	Lone rider	DNF	
178	Louis Grasset	France	Lone rider	DNF	
179	Mario Spinelli	Italy	Lone rider	44	
181	Alfons Lauwers	Belgium	Lone rider	DNF	
182	Vincent D'Hulst	France	Lone rider	DNF	
189	Sante Goi	Italy	Lone rider	48	
193	Albert Dejonghe	Belgium	Lone rider	DNF	
194	Louis Valckenaers	Belgium	Lone rider	DNF	
195	Henri Van Lerberghe	Belgium	Lone rider	DNF	
197	Ottavio Pratesi	Italy	Lone rider	33	
