= 1919 Tour de France, Stage 1 to Stage 8 =

Cycling race stages

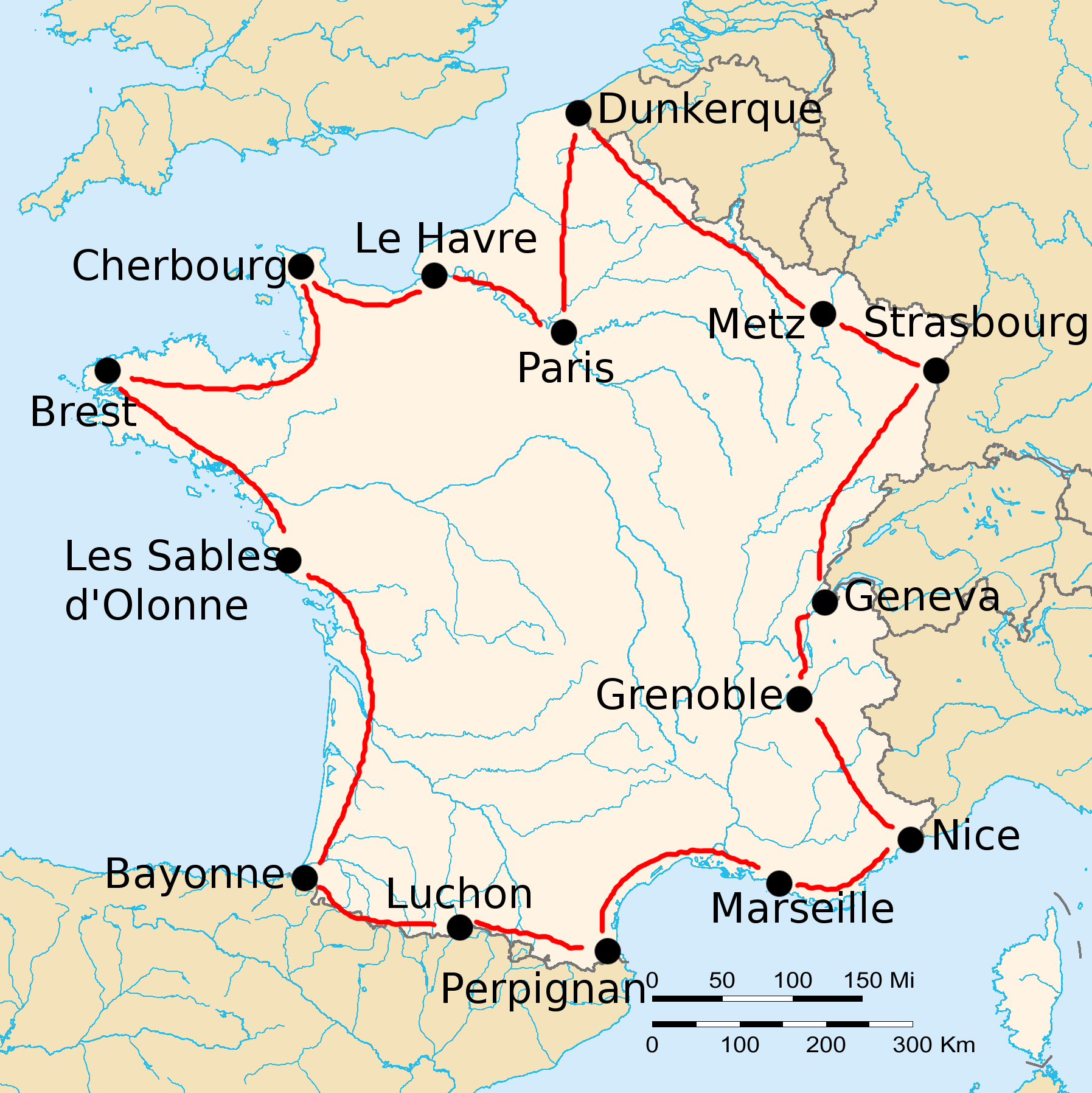
Route of the 1919 Tour de France

The 1919 Tour de France was the 13th edition of Tour de France, one of cycling's Grand Tours. The Tour began in Paris with a flat stage on 29 June, and Stage 8 occurred on 13 July with a flat stage to Marseille. The race finished in Paris on 27 July.

== Stage 1 ==
29 June 1919 — Paris to Le Havre, 388 km (241 mi)

Stage 1 result and general classification after stage 1

Rank	Rider	Time
1	Jean Rossius (BEL)	15h 56' 00"
2	Henri Pélissier (FRA)	+ 1' 15"
3	Joseph Van Daele (BEL)	+ 2' 10"
4	Eugène Christophe (FRA)	+ 5' 41"
5	Léon Scieur (BEL)	+ 9' 22"
6	Alfred Steux (BEL)	+ 10' 47"
7	Lucien Buysse (BEL)	+ 26' 27"
8	Hector Tiberghien (BEL)	+ 26' 53"
9	Émile Masson (BEL)	+ 27' 53"
10	Firmin Lambot (BEL)	+ 29' 59"

== Stage 2 ==
1 July 1919 — Le Havre to Cherbourg-en-Cotentin, 364 km (226 mi)

Stage 2 result

Rank	Rider	Time
1	Henri Pélissier (FRA)	15h 51' 13"
2	Francis Pélissier (FRA)	+ 1"
3	Honoré Barthélémy (FRA)	+ 3' 47"
4	Jean Alavoine (FRA)	s.t.
5	Jean Rossius (BEL)	+ 4' 40"
6	Émile Masson (BEL)	+ 9' 04"
7	Eugène Christophe (FRA)	+ 15' 25"
8	Firmin Lambot (BEL)	+ 17' 37"
9	Félix Goethals (FRA)	+ 56' 03"
10	Urbain Anseeuw (BEL)	s.t.

General classification after stage 2

Rank	Rider	Time
1	Henri Pélissier (FRA)	
2	Eugène Christophe (FRA)	+ 19' 52"
3	Jean Rossius (BEL)	+ 33' 25"
4		
5		
6		
7		
8		
9		
10		

== Stage 3 ==
3 July 1919 — Cherbourg-en-Cotentin to Brest, 405 km (252 mi)

Stage 3 result

Rank	Rider	Time
1	Francis Pélissier (FRA)	15h 30' 05"
2	Henri Pélissier (FRA)	s.t.
3	Jean Alavoine (FRA)	+ 3' 19"
4	Félix Goethals (FRA)	s.t.
5	Jules Masselis (BEL)	s.t.
6	Émile Masson (BEL)	s.t.
7	Eugène Christophe (FRA)	s.t.
8	Alfred Steux (BEL)	s.t.
9	Louis Mottiat (BEL)	s.t.
10	Honoré Barthélémy (FRA)	s.t.

General classification after stage 3

Rank	Rider	Time
1	Henri Pélissier (FRA)	
2	Eugène Christophe (FRA)	+ 23' 10"
3	Émile Masson (BEL)	+ 39' 01"
4		
5		
6		
7		
8		
9		
10		

== Stage 4 ==
5 July 1919 — Brest to Les Sables-d'Olonne, 412 km (256 mi)

Stage 4 result

Rank	Rider	Time
1	Jean Alavoine (FRA)	15h 51' 45"
2	Alfred Steux (BEL)	s.t.
3	Eugène Christophe (FRA)	s.t.
4	Émile Masson (BEL)	s.t.
5	Jacques Coomans (BEL)	s.t.
6	Léon Scieur (BEL)	+ 10' 24"
7	Firmin Lambot (BEL)	+ 13' 05"
8	Jules Masselis (BEL)	+ 31' 19"
9	Alois Verstraeten (BEL)	+ 31' 20"
10	Henri Pélissier (FRA)	+ 34' 52"

General classification after stage 4

Rank	Rider	Time
1	Eugène Christophe (FRA)	
2	Henri Pélissier (FRA)	+ 11' 42"
3	Émile Masson (BEL)	+ 15' 51"
4		
5		
6		
7		
8		
9		
10		

== Stage 5 ==
7 July 1919 — Les Sables-d'Olonne to Bayonne, 482 km (300 mi)

Stage 5 result

Rank	Rider	Time
1	Jean Alavoine (FRA)	18h 54' 07"
2	René Chassot (FRA)	s.t.
3	Léon Scieur (BEL)	s.t.
4	Joseph Van Daele (BEL)	s.t.
5	Jacques Coomans (BEL)	s.t.
6	Alois Verstraeten (BEL)	s.t.
7	Luigi Lucotti (ITA)	s.t.
8	Eugène Christophe (FRA)	+ 13"
9	Émile Masson (BEL)	s.t.
10	Firmin Lambot (BEL)	s.t.

General classification after stage 5

Rank	Rider	Time
1	Eugène Christophe (FRA)	
2	Émile Masson (BEL)	+ 15' 51"
3	Firmin Lambot (BEL)	+ 49' 49"
4		
5		
6		
7		
8		
9		
10		

== Stage 6 ==
9 July 1919 — Bayonne to Luchon, 326 km (203 mi)

Stage 6 result

Rank	Rider	Time
1	Honoré Barthélémy (FRA)	15h 41' 51"
2	Firmin Lambot (BEL)	+ 18' 37"
3	Jean Alavoine (FRA)	+ 33' 37"
4	Luigi Lucotti (ITA)	+ 36' 40"
5	Eugène Christophe (FRA)	+ 38' 03"
6	Léon Scieur (BEL)	+ 38' 08"
7	Jules Masselis (BEL)	+ 47' 35"
8	Émile Masson (BEL)	+ 51' 26"
9	Louis Mottiat (BEL)	+ 1h 28' 41"
10	Paul Duboc (FRA)	+ 1h 44' 24"

General classification after stage 6

Rank	Rider	Time
1	Eugène Christophe (FRA)	
2	Émile Masson (BEL)	+ 29' 14"
3	Firmin Lambot (BEL)	+ 30' 23"
4		
5		
6		
7		
8		
9		
10		

== Stage 7 ==
11 July 1919 — Luchon to Perpignan, 323 km (201 mi)

Stage 7 result

Rank	Rider	Time
1	Jean Alavoine (FRA)	13h 12' 43"
2	Eugène Christophe (FRA)	s.t.
3	Firmin Lambot (BEL)	s.t.
4	Honoré Barthélémy (FRA)	+ 10' 13"
5	Émile Masson (BEL)	+ 24' 35"
6	Léon Scieur (BEL)	s.t.
7	Paul Duboc (FRA)	s.t.
8	Jules Nempon (FRA)	s.t.
9	Jules Masselis (BEL)	+ 1h 21' 02"
10	Jacques Coomans (BEL)	+ 1h 21' 03"

General classification after stage 7

Rank	Rider	Time
1	Eugène Christophe (FRA)	
2	Firmin Lambot (BEL)	+ 30' 23"
3	Jean Alavoine (FRA)	+ 47' 34"
4		
5		
6		
7		
8		
9		
10		

== Stage 8 ==
13 July 1919 — Perpignan to Marseille, 370 km (230 mi)

Stage 8 result

Rank	Rider	Time
1	Jean Alavoine (FRA)	13h 50' 32"
2	Luigi Lucotti (ITA)	s.t.
3	Léon Scieur (BEL)	s.t.
4	Firmin Lambot (BEL)	s.t.
5	Eugène Christophe (FRA)	s.t.
6	Paul Duboc (FRA)	s.t.
7	Honoré Barthélémy (FRA)	+ 7' 50"
8	Joseph Van Daele (BEL)	s.t.
9	Félix Goethals (FRA)	+ 13' 33"
10	Jules Nempon (FRA)	+ 21' 04"

General classification after stage 8

Rank	Rider	Time
1	Eugène Christophe (FRA)	
2	Firmin Lambot (BEL)	+ 30' 23"
3	Jean Alavoine (FRA)	+ 47' 34"
4		
5		
6		
7		
8		
9		
10		
