= 1919 Tour de France, Stage 9 to Stage 15 =

Cycling race stages

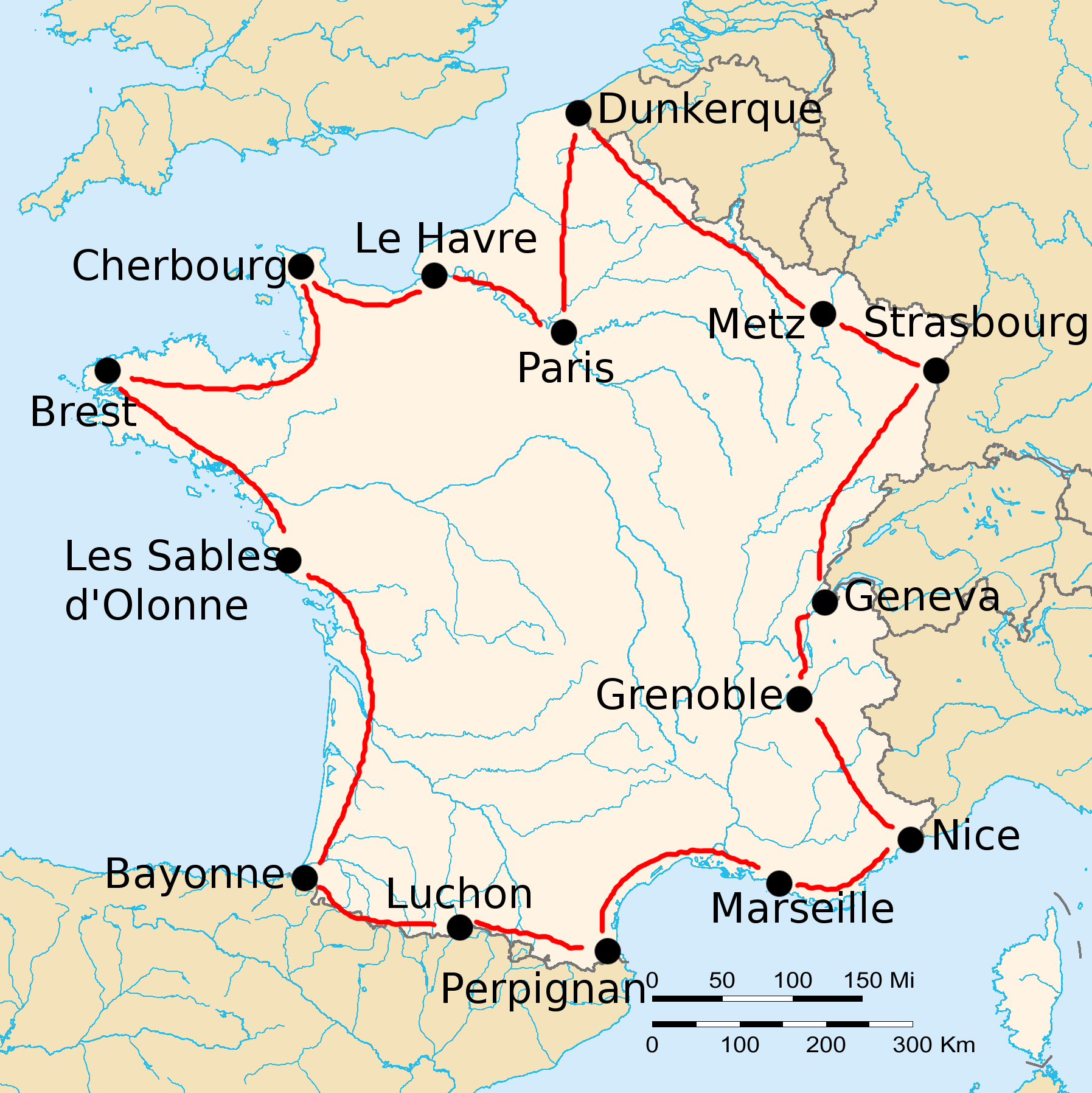
Route of the 1919 Tour de France

The 1919 Tour de France was the 13th edition of Tour de France, one of cycling's Grand Tours. The Tour began in Paris with a flat stage on 29 June, and Stage 9 occurred on 15 July with a mountainous stage from Marseille. The race finished in Paris on 27 July.

== Stage 9 ==
15 July 1919 — Marseille to Nice, 338 km (210 mi)

Stage 9 result

Rank	Rider	Time
1	Honoré Barthélémy (FRA)	13h 39' 48"
2	Luigi Lucotti (ITA)	+ 6' 09"
3	Alfred Steux (BEL)	+ 13' 37"
4	Jean Alavoine (FRA)	+ 16' 12"
5	Léon Scieur (BEL)	s.t.
6	Firmin Lambot (BEL)	s.t.
7	Eugène Christophe (FRA)	+ 20' 12"
8	Félix Goethals (FRA)	+ 35' 52"
9	Joseph Van Daele (BEL)	+ 48' 56"
10	Paul Duboc (FRA)	+ 1h 01' 57"

General classification after stage 9

Rank	Rider	Time
1	Eugène Christophe (FRA)	
2	Firmin Lambot (BEL)	+ 26' 23"
3	Jean Alavoine (FRA)	+ 43' 34"
4		
5		
6		
7		
8		
9		
10		

== Stage 10 ==
17 July 1919 — Nice to Grenoble, 333 km (207 mi)

Stage 10 result

Rank	Rider	Time
1	Honoré Barthélémy (FRA)	13h 08' 10"
2	Jean Alavoine (FRA)	+ 12' 19"
3	Firmin Lambot (BEL)	+ 12' 58"
4	Eugène Christophe (FRA)	+ 16' 02"
5	Léon Scieur (BEL)	+ 48' 05"
6	Paul Duboc (FRA)	+ 51' 50"
7	Jacques Coomans (BEL)	+ 1h 16' 57"
8	Jules Nempon (FRA)	s.t.
9	Alfred Steux (BEL)	+ 2h 35' 23"
10	Joseph Van Daele (BEL)	+ 2h 41' 40"

General classification after stage 10

Rank	Rider	Time
1	Eugène Christophe (FRA)	
2	Firmin Lambot (BEL)	+ 23' 19"
3	Jean Alavoine (FRA)	+ 39' 51"
4		
5		
6		
7		
8		
9		
10		

== Stage 11 ==
19 July 1919 — Grenoble to Geneva, 325 km (202 mi)

Eugene Christophe wore the first ever Tour de France race leader's yellow jersey, from the start of the stage.

Stage 11 result

Rank	Rider	Time
1	Honoré Barthélémy (FRA)	12h 46' 41"
2	Luigi Lucotti (ITA)	+ 10' 08"
3	Jean Alavoine (FRA)	+ 15' 06"
4	Léon Scieur (BEL)	s.t.
5	Eugène Christophe (FRA)	s.t.
6	Firmin Lambot (BEL)	s.t.
7	Jacques Coomans (BEL)	+ 26' 01"
8	Paul Duboc (FRA)	+ 1h 19' 50"
9	Alfred Steux (BEL)	+ 3h 13' 39"
10	Jules Nempon (FRA)	s.t.

General classification after stage 11

Rank	Rider	Time
1	Eugène Christophe (FRA)	
2	Firmin Lambot (BEL)	+ 23' 19"
3	Jean Alavoine (FRA)	+ 39' 51"
4		
5		
6		
7		
8		
9		
10		

== Stage 12 ==
21 July 1919 — Geneva to Strasbourg, 371 km (231 mi)

Stage 12 result

Rank	Rider	Time
1	Luigi Lucotti (ITA)	15h 08' 42"
2	Jean Alavoine (FRA)	s.t.
3	Léon Scieur (BEL)	s.t.
4	Firmin Lambot (BEL)	s.t.
5	Honoré Barthélémy (FRA)	s.t.
6	Paul Duboc (FRA)	s.t.
7	Eugène Christophe (FRA)	s.t.
8	Jules Nempon (FRA)	+ 3' 44"
9	Jacques Coomans (BEL)	+ 39' 41"
10	Joseph Van Daele (BEL)	+ 2h 15' 39"

General classification after stage 12

Rank	Rider	Time
1	Eugène Christophe (FRA)	
2	Firmin Lambot (BEL)	+ 23' 19"
3	Jean Alavoine (FRA)	+ 39' 51"
4		
5		
6		
7		
8		
9		
10		

== Stage 13 ==
23 July 1919 — Strasbourg to Metz, 315 km (196 mi)

Stage 13 result

Rank	Rider	Time
1	Luigi Lucotti (ITA)	11h 55' 13"
2	Honoré Barthélémy (FRA)	s.t.
3	Léon Scieur (BEL)	+ 2' 04"
4	Eugène Christophe (FRA)	+ 2' 49"
5	Jacques Coomans (BEL)	s.t.
6	Firmin Lambot (BEL)	+ 7' 35"
7	Joseph Van Daele (BEL)	s.t.
8	Jean Alavoine (FRA)	+ 12' 27"
9	Paul Duboc (FRA)	s.t.
10	Alfred Steux (BEL)	+ 2h 17' 42"

General classification after stage 13

Rank	Rider	Time
1	Eugène Christophe (FRA)	
2	Firmin Lambot (BEL)	+ 28' 05"
3	Jean Alavoine (FRA)	+ 49' 29"
4		
5		
6		
7		
8		
9		
10		

== Stage 14 ==
25 July 1919 — Metz to Dunkerque, 468 km (291 mi)

Stage 14 result

Rank	Rider	Time
1	Firmin Lambot (BEL)	21h 04' 27"
2	Léon Scieur (BEL)	+ 6' 43"
3	Joseph Van Daele (BEL)	+ 17' 08"
4	Luigi Lucotti (ITA)	+ 57' 46"
5	Jean Alavoine (FRA)	+ 1h 31' 39"
6	Paul Duboc (FRA)	s.t.
7	Honoré Barthélémy (FRA)	+ 2h 45' 46"
8	Jules Nempon (FRA)	s.t.
9	Alfred Steux (BEL)	s.t.
10	Eugène Christophe (FRA)	+ 2h 28' 58"

General classification after stage 14

Rank	Rider	Time
1	Firmin Lambot (BEL)	
2	Jean Alavoine (FRA)	+ 1h 53' 03"
3	Eugène Christophe (FRA)	+ 2h 00' 53"
4		
5		
6		
7		
8		
9		
10		

== Stage 15 ==
27 July 1919 — Dunkerque to Paris, 340 km (210 mi)

Stage 15 result

Rank	Rider	Time
1	Jean Alavoine (FRA)	15h 00' 54"
2	Luigi Lucotti (ITA)	s.t.
3	Honoré Barthélémy (FRA)	s.t.
4	Léon Scieur (BEL)	s.t.
5	Jacques Coomans (BEL)	s.t.
6	Jules Nempon (FRA)	+ 5' 02"
7	Firmin Lambot (BEL)	+ 10' 09"
8	Joseph Van Daele (BEL)	+ 11' 08"
9	Alfred Steux (BEL)	+ 34' 15"
10	Eugène Christophe (FRA)	+ 35' 47"

General classification after stage 15

Rank	Rider	Time
1	Firmin Lambot (BEL)	231h 07' 15"
2	Jean Alavoine (FRA)	+ 1h 42' 54"
3	Eugène Christophe (FRA)	+ 2h 26' 31"
4	Léon Scieur (BEL)	+ 2h 52' 15"
5	Honoré Barthélémy (FRA)	+ 4h 14' 22"
6	Jacques Coomans (BEL)	+ 15h 21' 34"
7	Luigi Lucotti (ITA)	+ 16h 01' 12"
8	Joseph Van Daele (BEL)	+ 18h 23' 02"
9	Alfred Steux (BEL)	+ 20h 29' 01"
10	Jules Nempon (FRA)	+ 21h 44' 12"
