= 1921 Paris–Roubaix =

Cycling race

Race details
- Dates: 27 March 1921
- Stages: 1
- Distance: 263 km (163.4 mi)
- Winning time: 9h 2' 30"

Results
	Winner	Henri Pélissier (FRA)
	Second	Francis Pélissier (FRA)
	Third	Léon Scieur (BEL)

The 1921 Paris–Roubaix was the 22nd edition of the Paris–Roubaix, a classic one-day cycle race in France. The single day event was held on 27 March 1921 and stretched 263 km (163 mi) from Paris to its end in a velodrome in Roubaix. The winner was Henri Pélissier from France.

== Results ==
Final results (1–10)
Rank	Cyclist	Time
1	Henri Pélissier (FRA)	9h 2' 30″
2	Francis Pélissier (FRA)	+0' 40″
3	Léon Scieur (BEL)	+0' 42″
4	René Vermandel (BEL)	+0' 45″
5	Romain Bellenger (BEL)	+1' 55″
6	Paul Deman (BEL)	+2' 18″
7	Hector Tiberghien (BEL)	+3' 28″
8	Félix Goethals (FRA)	+4' 45″
9	Émile Masson (BEL)	+7' 55″
10	Alfred Steux (BEL)	+8' 39″
