= 1912 Liège–Bastogne–Liège =

Race details
- Dates: 15 September 1912
- Stages: 1
- Distance: 257 km (160 mi)
- Winning time: 8h 35' 00"

Results
	Winner	Omer Verschoore (BEL)
	Second	Jacques Coomans (BEL)
	Third	André Blaise (BEL)

The 1912 Liège–Bastogne–Liège was the seventh edition of the Liège–Bastogne–Liège cycle race and was held on 15 September 1912. The race started and finished in Liège. The race was won by Omer Verschoore.

== General classification ==
Final general classification

Rank	Rider	Time
1	Omer Verschoore (BEL)	8h 35' 00"
2	Jacques Coomans (BEL)	+ 0"
3	André Blaise (BEL)	+ 2' 30"
4	François Dubois (BEL)	+ 8' 00"
5	Victor Fastre (BEL)	+ 10' 00"
6	Louis Mottiat (BEL)	+ 10' 00"
7	Auguste Lambot (BEL)	+ 12' 00"
8	Achille Depauw (BEL)	+ 16' 00"
9	Louis Petitjean (BEL)	+ 19' 00"
10	Maurice Kreutz (BEL)	+ 45' 00"
