= 1911 Liège–Bastogne–Liège =

Race details
- Dates: 12 June 1911
- Stages: 1
- Distance: 234 km (145 mi)
- Winning time: 8h 10' 22"

Results
	Winner	Joseph Van Daele (BEL)
	Second	Armand Lenoir (BEL)
	Third	Victor Kraenen (BEL)

The 1911 Liège–Bastogne–Liège was the sixth edition of the Liège–Bastogne–Liège cycle race and was held on 12 June 1911. The race started and finished in Liège. The race was won by Joseph Van Daele.

== General classification ==
Final general classification

Rank	Rider	Time
1	Joseph Van Daele (BEL)	8h 10' 22"
2	Armand Lenoir (BEL)	+ 30"
3	Victor Kraenen (BEL)	+ 1' 10"
4	Auguste Benoît (BEL)	+ 1' 10"
5	Hubert Noel (BEL)	+ 1' 10"
6	Jean Rossius (BEL)	+ 1' 30"
7	Félicien Salmon (BEL)	+ 1' 40"
8	Jacques Coomans (BEL)	+ 1' 40"
9	Alfons Lauwers (BEL)	+ 1' 40"
10	Léon Scieur (BEL)	+ 1' 40"
