= Lampaert =

Lampaert is a surname. Notable people with the surname include:

- Maurice Lampaert (1896–1976), Belgian cyclist
- Yves Lampaert (born 1991), Belgian cyclist
