= 1909 Liège–Bastogne–Liège =

Race details
- Dates: 16 May 1909
- Stages: 1
- Distance: 235 km (146 mi)
- Winning time: 8h 21' 00"

Results
	Winner	Victor Fastre (BEL)
	Second	Eugène Charlier (BEL)
	Third	Paul Deman (BEL)

The 1909 Liège–Bastogne–Liège was the fifth edition of the Liège–Bastogne–Liège cycle race and was held on 16 May 1909. The race started and finished in Liège. The race was won by Victor Fastre.

== General classification ==
Final general classification

Rank	Rider	Time
1	Victor Fastre (BEL)	8h 21' 00"
2	Eugène Charlier (BEL)	+ 0"
3	Paul Deman (BEL)	+ 0"
4	Félicien Salmon (BEL)	+ 0"
5	Hector Tiberghien (BEL)	+ 0"
6	Charles Deruyter (BEL)	+ 0"
7	Arthur Geoffroy (BEL)	+ 0"
8	Aimé Behaeghe (BEL)	+ 0"
9	Joseph Matagne (BEL)	+ 1' 30"
10	Jacques Coomans (BEL)	+ 1' 30"
