= Gerwig (name) =

Gerwig is a German surname from the medieval masculine given name Gerwig, derived from the Old High German/Old Saxon element gēr, meaning "spear", and the Old Saxon/Old English wig, meaning "war" or "battle".

Notable people with the surname include:

- Anne Gerwig (born 1963), American politician
- Greta Gerwig (born 1983), American actress, screenwriter, and film director
- René Gerwig (1891–1965), French cyclist
- Robert Gerwig (1820–1885), German civil engineer and politician
- Walter Gerwig (1899–1966), German lutenist and composer
