= 1913 Giro di Lombardia =

Race details
- Dates: 2 November 1913
- Stages: 1
- Distance: 235 km (146.0 mi)
- Winning time: 7h 43' 48"

Results
	Winner	Henri Pélissier (FRA)
	Second	Maurice Brocco (FRA)
	Third	Marcel Godivier (FRA)

The 1913 Giro di Lombardia was the ninth edition of the Giro di Lombardia cycle race and was held on 2 November 1913. The race started and finished in Milan. The race was won by Henri Pélissier.

== General classification ==
Final general classification

Rank	Rider	Time
1	Henri Pélissier (FRA)	7h 43' 48"
2	Maurice Brocco (FRA)	+ 2"
3	Marcel Godivier (FRA)	+ 2"
4	Luigi Annoni (ITA)	+ 2"
5	Erich Aberger (GER)	+ 2"
6	Dario Beni (ITA)	+ 2"
7	Luigi Lucotti (ITA)	+ 2"
8	Carlo Galetti (ITA)	+ 2"
9	Richard Schenkel (GER)	+ 2"
10	Romolo Verde (ITA)	+ 2"
