= Victor Fastre =

Belgian cyclist

- Fastre in 1909

Personal information
- Born: Victor Joseph Henri Fastre; 19 May 1890 Liège, Belgium
- Died: 12 September 1914 (aged 24) Rotselaar, Belgium

Cycling career
- Sport: Cycling
- Discipline: Road
- Role: Rider

Professional teams
- 1910-11: Alcyon-Dunlop
- 1912: Sarolea
- 1913-14: Individual

Major wins
- Liège–Bastogne–Liège 1909

Victor Joseph Henri Fastre (19 May 1890 – 12 September 1914) was a Belgian racing cyclist. He won Liège–Bastogne–Liège in 1909.

== Personal life and death ==
Fastre was son of Hubert Henri Joseph Fastre and his wife Marie Catherine Sophie (nee Leuwen). Enlisted in the Belgian Army in 1910, he was killed in action within Belgium during World War I.

== Palmarès ==
1907
1st Bruxelles-Jemeppe
1909
1st Liège–Bastogne–Liège
2nd Namur–Bruxelles
1910
1st Angleur–Tilff–Angleur
1911
1st Antwerpen–Kalmthout
1912
5th Liège–Bastogne–Liège
