= 1919 Paris–Roubaix =

Cycling race

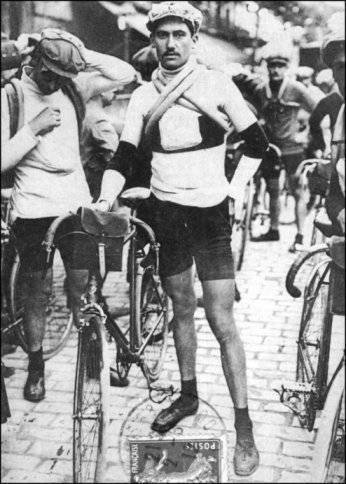
- Henri Pélissier, winner of the edition

Race details
- Dates: 20 April 1919
- Stages: 1
- Distance: 280 km (170 mi)
- Winning time: 12h 15' 00"

Results
	Winner	Henri Pélissier (FRA)
	Second	Philippe Thys (BEL)
	Third	Honoré Barthélémy (FRA)

The 1919 Paris–Roubaix was the 20th edition of the Paris–Roubaix, a classic one-day cycle race in France. The single day event was held on 20 April 1919 and stretched 280 km (174 mi) from Paris to its end in a velodrome in Roubaix. The winner was Henri Pélissier from France.

== Results ==
Final results (1–10)
Rank	Cyclist	Time
1	Henri Pélissier (FRA)	12h 15' 00″
2	Philippe Thys (BEL)	+0' 00″
3	Honoré Barthélémy (FRA)	+0' 00″
4	Louis Heusghem (BEL)	+1' 00″
5	Alex Michiels (BEL)	+1' 00″
6	Francis Pélissier (FRA)	+10' 00″
7	Jean Rossius (BEL)	+15' 00″
8	Émile Masson (BEL)	+15' 30″
9	Eugène Christophe (FRA)	+16' 00″
10	Alfred Steux (BEL)	+24' 00″
