= 1920 Giro di Lombardia =

Race details
- Dates: 9 November 1920
- Stages: 1
- Distance: 242 km (150.4 mi)
- Winning time: 8h 23' 00"

Results
	Winner	Henri Pélissier (FRA)
	Second	Giovanni Brunero (ITA)
	Third	Gaetano Belloni (ITA)

The 1920 Giro di Lombardia was the 16th edition of the Giro di Lombardia cycle race and was held on 9 November 1920. The race started and finished in Milan. The race was won by Henri Pélissier.

== General classification ==
Final general classification

Rank	Rider	Team	Time
1	Henri Pélissier (FRA)	Bianchi-Pirelli	8h 23' 00"
2	Giovanni Brunero (ITA)	Legnano	+ 1' 20"
3	Gaetano Belloni (ITA)	Bianchi-Pirelli	+ 1' 20"
4	Giuseppe Azzini (ITA)	Bianchi-Pirelli	+ 11' 25"
5	Louis Luguet (FRA)		+ 12' 18"
6	Alfredo Sivocci (ITA)	Legnano	+ 17' 30"
7	Federico Gay (ITA)	Bianchi-Pirelli	+ 17' 30"
8	Lauro Bordin (ITA)	Bianchi-Pirelli	+ 17' 30"
9	Ugo Agostoni (ITA)	Bianchi-Pirelli	+ 19' 10"
10	Carlo Galetti (ITA)	Legnano-Pirelli	+ 23' 15"
