= André Renard (cyclist) =

French cyclist

Personal information
- Born: 11 December 1889
- Died: 17 September 1950 (aged 60)

Cycling career
- Sport: Cycling
- Role: Rider

André Renard (11 December 1889 – 17 September 1950) was a French racing cyclist. He rode in the 1919 Tour de France.
