= 1911 Giro di Lombardia =

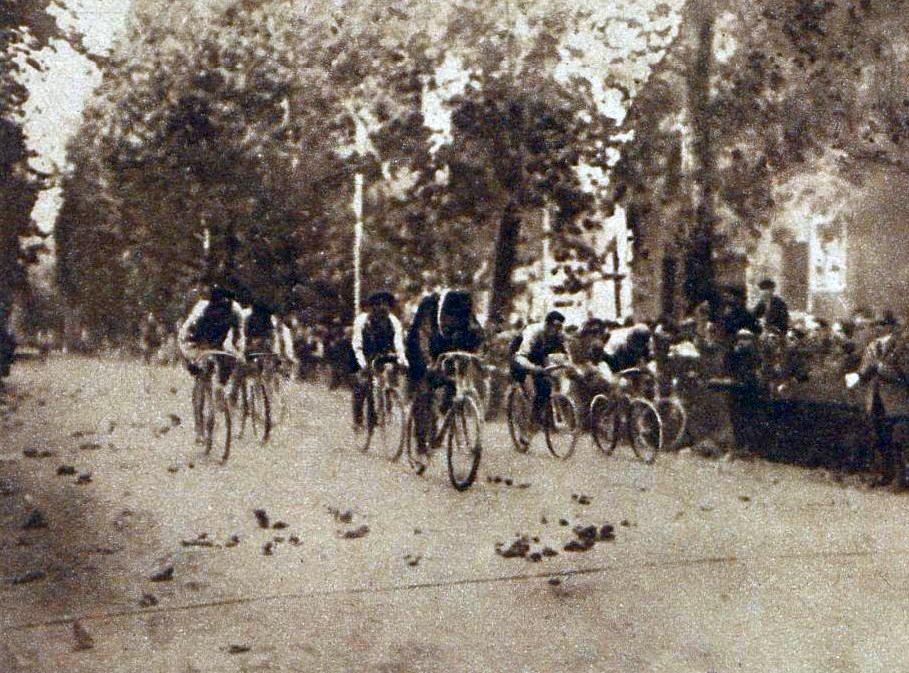
- Henri Pélissier won the 1911 event in the sprint

Race details
- Dates: 5 November 1911
- Stages: 1
- Distance: 232 km (144.2 mi)
- Winning time: 7h 34' 30"

Results
	Winner	Henri Pélissier (FRA)
	Second	Giovanni Micheletto (ITA)
	Third	Cyrille van Hauwaert (BEL)

The 1911 Giro di Lombardia was the seventh edition of the Giro di Lombardia cycle race and was held on 5 November 1911. The race started in Milan and finished in Sesto San Giovanni. The race was won by Henri Pélissier.

== General classification ==
Final general classification

Rank	Rider	Time
1	Henri Pélissier (FRA)	7h 34' 30"
2	Giovanni Micheletto (ITA)	+ 0"
3	Cyrille van Hauwaert (BEL)	+ 0"
=4	Maurice Brocco (FRA)	+ 0"
=4	Carlo Durando (ITA)	+ 0"
=4	Leopoldo Torricelli (ITA)	+ 0"
=7	Pierino Albini (ITA)	+ 0"
=7	Dario Beni (ITA)	+ 0"
=7	Emilio Chironi (ITA)	+ 0"
=7	Carlo Galetti (ITA)	+ 0"
