= André Huret =

French cyclist

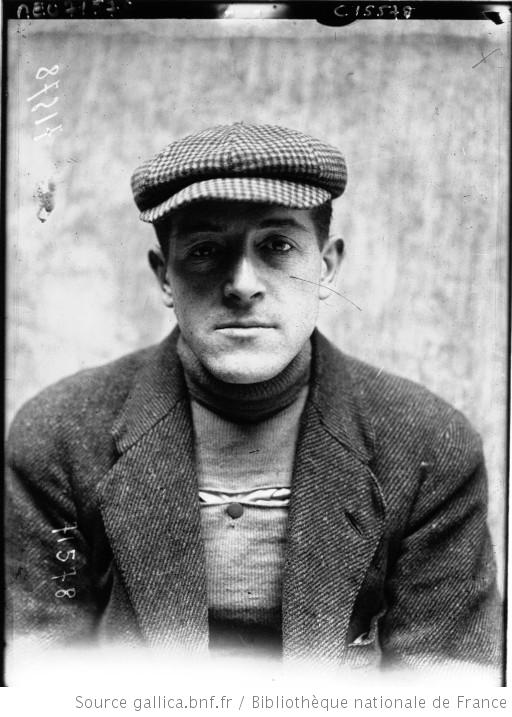

Personal information
- Born: 28 May 1891
- Died: 20 September 1964 (aged 73)

Cycling career
- Sport: Cycling
- Role: Rider

André Huret (28 May 1891 – 20 September 1964) was a French racing cyclist. He rode in the 1919 Tour de France. Huret's company made derailleur gear systems from the 1930s to the 1960s.
