= Basiel Matthys =

Belgian cyclist

Personal information
- Born: 26 February 1893
- Died: 7 January 1976 (aged 82)

Cycling career
- Sport: Cycling
- Role: Rider

Basiel Matthys (26 February 1893 – 7 January 1976) was a Belgian racing cyclist. He rode in the 1919 Tour de France.
