= Alfred Brailly =

French cyclist

Personal information
- Born: 8 October 1890
- Died: 17 November 1951 (aged 61)

Cycling career
- Sport: Cycling
- Role: Rider

Alfred Brailly (8 October 1890 – 17 November 1951) was a French racing cyclist. He rode in the 1919 Tour de France.
