= Fernand Sellier =

Belgian cyclist

Personal information
- Born: 27 June 1889
- Died: 3 August 1962 (aged 73)

Cycling career
- Sport: Cycling
- Role: Rider

Fernand Sellier (27 June 1889 – 3 August 1962) was a Belgian racing cyclist. He rode in the 1920 Tour de France.
