= René Tissier =

French cyclist

Personal information
- Born: 29 September 1899
- Died: 5 January 1982 (aged 82)

Cycling career
- Sport: Cycling
- Role: Rider

René Tissier (29 September 1899 – 5 January 1982) was a French racing cyclist. He rode in the 1920 Tour de France.
