= Camille Van Marcke =

Belgian cyclist

Personal information
- Born: 25 March 1884

Cycling career
- Sport: Cycling
- Role: Rider

Camille Van Marcke (born 25 March 1884, date of death unknown) was a Belgian racing cyclist. He rode in the 1919 Tour de France.
