= Robert Asse =

French cyclist

Personal information
- Born: August 17, 1894 France
- Died: 27 April 1932 (aged 37)

Cycling career
- Sport: Cycling
- Discipline: Road
- Role: Rider

Robert Asse (17 August 1894 – 27 April 1932) was a French racing cyclist. He started 10 Tours of France during his career but never completed any. Asse was severely wounded during World War I - deafness, reduced vision in one eye and a skull injury made competing difficult.

== Grand Tour general classification results timeline ==
Grand Tour	1919	1920	1921	1922	1923	1924	1925	1926	1927	1928	1929
Giro d'Italia	Did not Race										
Tour de France	DNF	DNF	DNF	DNF	DNF	–	DNF	DNF	DNF	DNF	DNF
Vuelta a España	Did not Exist										
