= Louis Thuayre =

French cyclist

Personal information
- Born: 17 January 1895
- Died: 28 September 1948 (aged 53)

Cycling career
- Sport: Cycling
- Role: Rider

Louis Thuayre (17 January 1895 – 28 September 1948) was a French racing cyclist. He rode in the 1920 Tour de France.
