= Aloïs Verstraeten =

Belgian cyclist

Personal information
- Born: 2 January 1888

Cycling career
- Sport: Cycling
- Role: Rider

Aloïs Verstraeten (born 2 January 1888, date of death unknown) was a Belgian racing cyclist. He rode in the 1919 Tour de France.
