= Pierre Excoffier (cyclist) =

French cyclist

Personal information
- Born: 5 October 1894 Albertville, France
- Died: 8 February 1945 (aged 50) Dachau, Nazi Germany

Cycling career
- Sport: Cycling
- Role: Rider

Pierre Louis Excoffier (5 October 1894 – 8 February 1945) was a French racing cyclist. He rode in the 1920 Tour de France and 1921 Tour de France. A resistance member during World War II, he died in the Dachau concentration camp.
