= Charles Van Mol =

Belgian cyclist

Personal information
- Born: 21 November 1895

Cycling career
- Sport: Cycling
- Role: Rider

Charles Van Mol (born 21 November 1895, date of death unknown) was a Belgian racing cyclist.

== Career ==
He rode in the 1920 Tour de France.
