= René Gerwig =

French cyclist

Personal information
- Born: 24 September 1891 Petit-Quevilly, France
- Died: 30 May 1965 (aged 73) Pont-Audemer, France

Cycling career
- Sport: Cycling
- Role: Rider

René Gerwig (24 September 1891 – 30 May 1965) was a French racing cyclist. He rode in the 1919 Tour de France.
