= François Beths =

Belgian cyclist

Personal information
- Born: 8 January 1889
- Died: 20 May 1973 (aged 84)

Cycling career
- Sport: Cycling
- Role: Rider

François Beths (8 January 1889 – 20 May 1973) was a Belgian racing cyclist. He rode in the 1920 Tour de France.
