= Léon Kopp =

Belgian cyclist

Personal information
- Born: 27 April 1886

Cycling career
- Sport: Cycling
- Role: Rider

Léon Kopp (born 27 April 1886, date of death unknown) was a Belgian racing cyclist.

Born in 1886, Koop was before World War I already a competitive cyclist, and participated among others in the 1911 Tour of Belgium. After World War I he competed in main cycling races and achieved among others a third place in Liège-Malmédy-Liège in 1919. He rode in the 1919 Tour de France and 1920 Tour de France.
