= Gaston Van Waesberghe =

Belgian cyclist

Personal information
- Born: 1885 Montignies-sur-Sambre, Belgium
- Died: Unknown

Cycling career
- Sport: Cycling
- Role: Rider

Gaston Van Waesberghe (born 1885, date of death unknown) was a Belgian racing cyclist. He rode in the 1919 Tour de France.
