= Joseph Verdickt =

Belgian cyclist

Personal information
- Born: 30 June 1894

Cycling career
- Sport: Cycling
- Role: Rider

Joseph Verdickt (born 30 June 1894, date of death unknown) was a Belgian racing cyclist. He rode in the 1919 Tour de France.
