= Marcel Benel =

French cyclist

Personal information
- Born: 17 April 1894
- Died: 5 May 1934 (aged 40)

Cycling career
- Sport: Cycling
- Role: Rider

Marcel Benel (17 April 1894 – 5 May 1934) was a French racing cyclist. He rode in the 1920 Tour de France.
