= Napoléon Paoli =

French cyclist

Personal information
- Born: 18 February 1892

Cycling career
- Sport: Cycling
- Role: Rider

Napoléon Paoli (born 18 February 1892, date of death unknown) was a French racing cyclist. He rode in the 1919 Tour de France. He won Nice-Annot-Nice in 1918 and Marseille-Nice in 1919. In Marseille-Nice he had over the years multiple podium achievements. In the stage race Circuit de Provence he finished fifth overall in 1920.
