= Mathieu Caplat =

French cyclist

Personal information
- Born: 29 November 1886
- Died: 15 August 1943 (aged 57)

Cycling career
- Sport: Cycling
- Role: Rider

Mathieu Caplat (29 November 1886 – 15 August 1943) was a French racing cyclist. He rode in the 1920 Tour de France and 1921 Tour de France.
