= Arthur Godart =

French cyclist

Personal information
- Born: 21 July 1889

Cycling career
- Sport: Cycling
- Role: Rider

Arthur Godart (born 21 July 1889, date of death unknown) was a French racing cyclist. He rode in the 1920 Tour de France.
