= Julien Samyn =

Belgian cyclist

Personal information
- Born: 3 January 1890
- Died: 1 April 1968 (aged 78)

Cycling career
- Sport: Cycling
- Role: Rider

Julien Samyn (3 January 1890 – 1 April 1968) was a Belgian racing cyclist. He rode in the 1920 Tour de France.
