= Henri Allard =

Belgian cyclist

Personal information
- Born: 6 February 1891
- Died: 17 October 1982 (aged 91)

Cycling career
- Sport: Cycling
- Role: Rider

Henri Allard (6 February 1891 – 17 October 1982) was a Belgian racing cyclist. He rode in the 1919 Tour de France.
