= René Chassot =

French cyclist

Personal information
- Born: 18 January 1891
- Died: 18 June 1922 (aged 31)

Cycling career
- Sport: Cycling
- Role: Rider

René Chassot (French: [ʁəne ʃaso]; 18 January 1891 – 18 June 1922) was a French racing cyclist. He rode in the 1919 Tour de France.
