= Maurice Lampaert =

Belgian cyclist

Personal information
- Born: 25 February 1896
- Died: 22 November 1976 (aged 80)

Cycling career
- Sport: Cycling
- Role: Rider

Maurice Lampaert (25 February 1896 – 22 November 1976) was a Belgian racing cyclist. He rode in the 1920 Tour de France.
