= Omer Verschoore =

Belgian cyclist

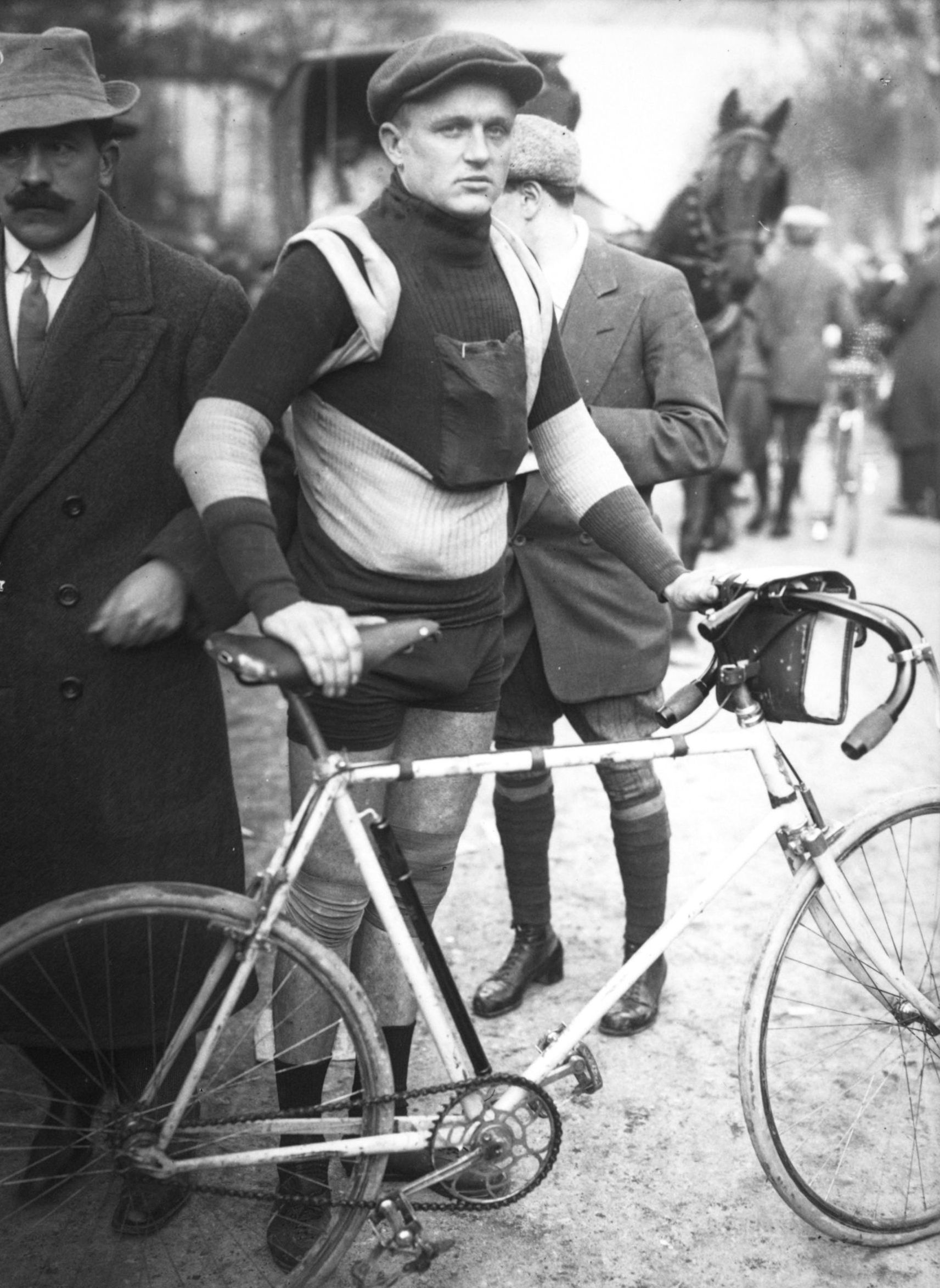
- Verschoore at the 1913 Paris–Roubaix

Personal information
- Full name: Omer Verschoore
- Born: 2 December 1888 Moorslede, Belgium
- Died: 27 November 1931 (aged 42) Paris, Belgium

Cycling career
- Sport: Cycling
- Role: Rider

Omer Verschoore (2 December 1888 – 27 November 1931) was a Belgian racing cyclist. He won the Belgian national road race title in 1912.
