= Urbain Anseeuw =

Belgian cyclist

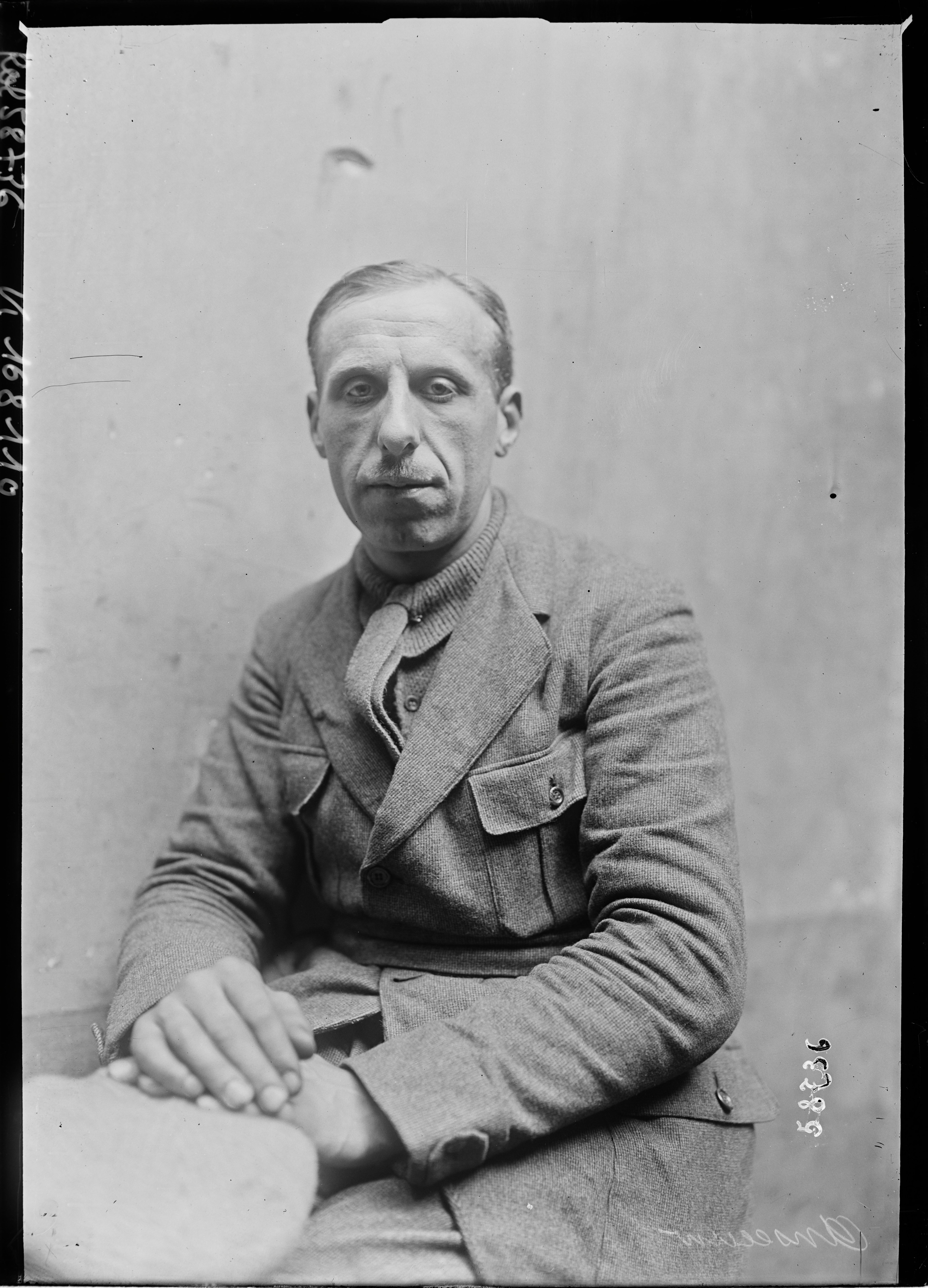

Personal information
- Born: 5 January 1892
- Died: 9 March 1962 (aged 70)

Cycling career
- Sport: Cycling
- Role: Rider

Urbain Anseeuw (5 January 1892 – 9 March 1962) was a Belgian racing cyclist. He rode in the 1919 Tour de France.
