= Henri Leclerc =

French cyclist

Personal information
- Full name: Leon Henri Leclerc
- Born: 8 June 1880 Paris XI, France
- Died: 1 May 1932 (aged 51)
- Height: 1.56 m (5 ft 1 in)

Cycling career
- Sport: Cycling
- Role: Rider

Leon Henri Leclerc (French pronunciation: [ɑ̃ʁi ləklɛʁ]; 8 June 1880 — 1 May 1932) was a French racing cyclist.

He was born on 8 June 1880 in the 11th arrondissement of Paris. He competed between 1912 and 1920 in five editions of the Tour de France. He finished in last place in the 1914 Tour de France, winning the Lanterne Rouge. He also competed in other main international cycling races, including Bordeaux-Paris finishing 14th in 1920 and Paris-Brest-Paris.
