= Henri Pélissier =

French cyclist (1889-1935)

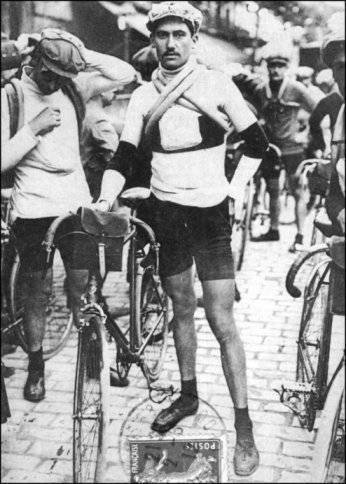
- Henri Pelissier, 1919

Personal information
- Full name: Henri Pélissier
- Born: 22 January 1889 Paris, France
- Died: 1 May 1935 (aged 46) Dampierre, France

Cycling career
- Sport: Cycling
- Discipline: Road
- Role: Rider

Major wins
- Grand Tours Tour de France General classification (1923) Mountains classification (1923) 10 individual stages (1913, 1914, 1919, 1920, 1923) One-day races and Classics National Road Race Championships (1919) Paris–Brussels (1920) Paris–Roubaix (1919, 1921) Paris–Tours (1922) Giro di Lombardia (1911, 1913, 1920) Milan–San Remo (1912) Bordeaux–Paris (1919) Milano–Torino (1911)

Henri Pélissier (pronounced [ɑ̃.ʁi pe.li.sje]; 22 January 1889 – 1 May 1935) was a French racing cyclist from Paris and champion of the 1923 Tour de France. In addition to his 29 career victories, he was known for his long-standing feud with Tour founder Henri Desgrange and for protesting against the conditions endured by riders in the early years of the Tour. He was killed by his lover with the gun that his wife had used to commit suicide.

== Background ==
Pélissier was one of four brothers, three of whom became professional cyclists. He began racing professionally in 1911 and amassed important victories before the First World War, including the 1912 Milan–San Remo and three stages in the 1914 Tour de France.

After the war he resumed competition, winning Paris–Roubaix in 1919 and the second (and final) running of the Circuit des Champs de Bataille in 1920. He entered the Tour de France in 1920 and for the next four years. Before the 1921 Paris–Roubaix, Pélissier and his brother Francis demanded their sponsor pay them more than racers usually received. Their request was rebuffed and they rode as individuals without team support. Henri Desgrange, organiser of the Tour de France, vowed that they would never again appear on the front page of his newspaper L'Auto, only to eat his words when Pélissier emerged the champion.

== Origins ==
The Pélissier family came from the Auvergne region of central France. They were cattle farmers and moved to Paris to run a farm there.

René de Latour wrote in Sporting Cyclist:

Auvergnats are considered to be very tight with their money. The old Pélissiers came to Paris in wooden shoes and finished up as millionaires. They took on a farm at Auteuil, the classy part of Paris to the south-west. It was really the last farm in Paris, the two dozen cows never really knowing what fresh air meant. The two elder sons had to work for their father on leaving school at the easy but very early-morning job of delivering the milk from a horse-drawn cart. That was around 1910. The elder boy [Henri] did not think much of this. He had started bike racing, was a good amateur, and wanted to turn professional. Father Pélissier had different ideas; to him the bicycle was not a god but a devil.

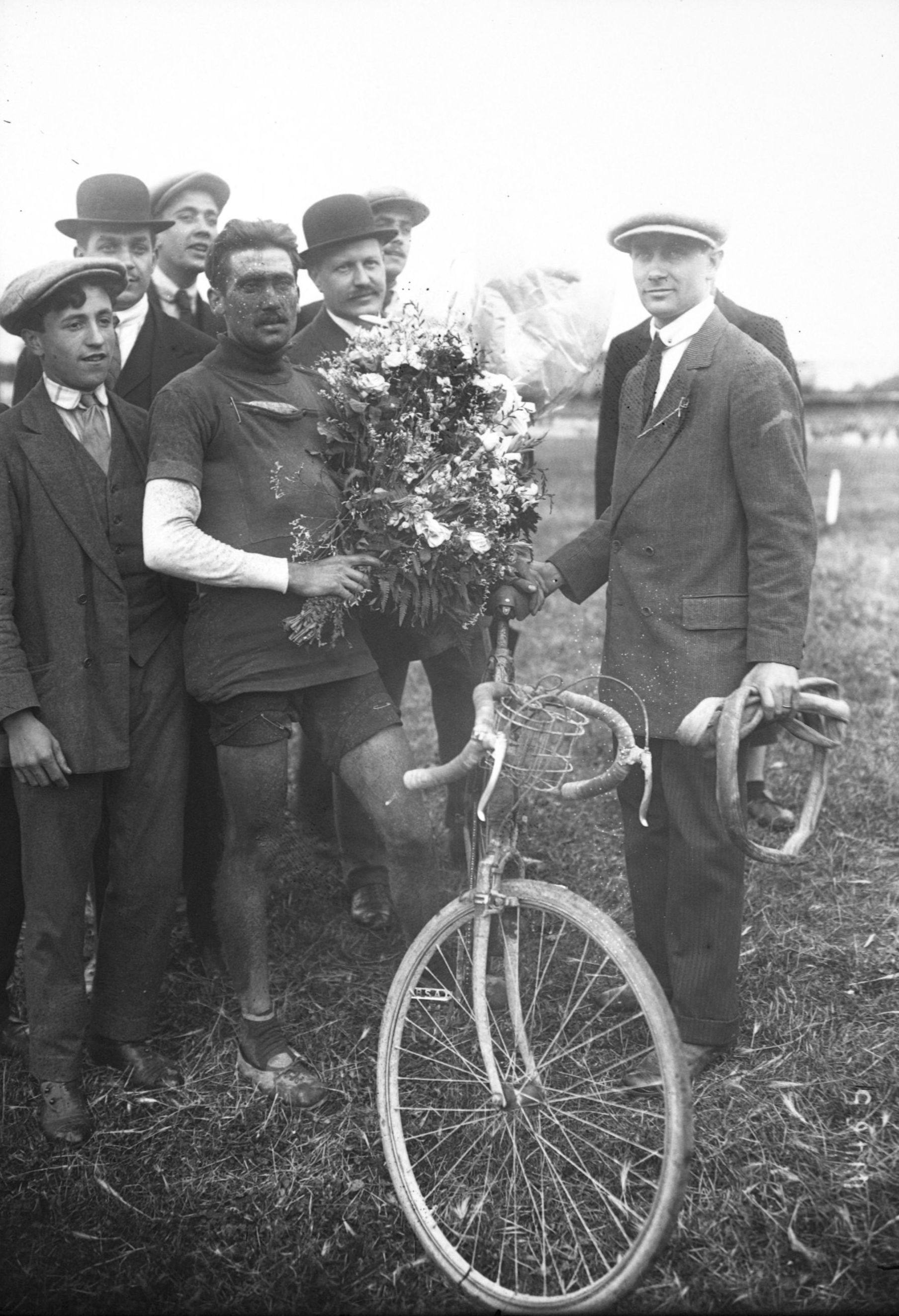
Henri Pelissier after finishing the 1914 Tour de France.

== Racing career ==
Henri Pélissier first rode a bicycle when he was eleven, because he needed to get rid of his energy. When he was 15 years old, he rode his first race, a track race that was meant for 17-year-olds. Henri Pélissier was so thin as a young man that friends called him Ficelle, after France's thinnest loaf of bread. The word also means "string". One of four brothers, three of whom became professional cyclists, he was by far the strongest. He also became known for a stubborn, difficult personality which had led his father to banish him from the family farm when he was 16. In the next years, Henri Pélissier rode a few small road races, but it was not until 1908 when he started to ride seriously as an amateur. By 1910, he had established his name as a competent rider, and in 1911, 22 years old, he got a professional licence.

On 15 August 1911 he was walking near the Porte Maillot on the edge of Paris when he met one of the great cycling heroes of the day, Lucien Petit-Breton.

The two knew each other slightly but Pélissier was more in awe of Petit-Breton than the other way round because Petit-Breton had already ridden the Tour de France four times and won it in 1907 and 1908. He had also won Milan–San Remo in 1907, which led to a further engagement to ride in Italy. He asked Pélissier if he wanted to join him. He had six hours to make up his mind, collect his bags and bike and meet him for the 9pm train to Milan.

Their first race was the Tour of Romany-Tuscany. Pélissier crashed and didn't finish. But he won Turin-Florence-Rome and the Tour of Lombardy. He returned to ride the Tour of Lombardy the following year as well, crashing at the entrance to the horse track in Milan with Costante Girardengo, the Italian star. There were 400m to the finish and the leaders were going flat out. A heap of riders came down with them. Pélissier got back on and passed the rest before the line and the crowd was so angry at how it perceived he had ruined Girardengo's chances that they ran onto the circuit and began pushing and punching Pélissier so much that he had scramble into the judges' watchtower and wait for 80 policemen to quieten the angry spectators three metres below him.

Pélissier came second in his first Tour de France, in 1914, less than two minutes behind Philippe Thys of Belgium. He took three stages: the 10th, 12th and 15th.

Pélissier came first in 1923, at 34. He attacked on the col de l'Izoard and dropped the Belgians who had been seen as the favourites. He also won Milan–San Remo, Paris–Brussels, Paris–Roubaix twice, three Tours of Lombardy, Bordeaux–Paris and Paris–Tours.

Francis and Henri Pelissier

== Personality and trade union ==
Pélissier's life was rarely happy. He was repeatedly at war with organisers, sponsors and the press. He niggled everyone with unhidden pleasure. The organiser of the Tour, Henri Desgrange, called him "this pigheadedly arrogant champion." When he went training, he urged his friends to take it easy — 'It's important not to wear yourself out' he advised — but never let on that he'd been out at dawn for 40 kilometres' speed training.

He dismissed his rivals with a sneer. "The others are cart horses; I'm a thoroughbred," he said during the Tour de France. Next day Pélissier punctured and the whole field left him and his brother Francis 30 minutes behind.

He argued repeatedly with Desgrange, who in 1920 penalised Pélissier two minutes for leaving a flat tyre by the roadside. Pélissier left the race in protest. He then made a point of winning everywhere else for the rest of the season. Desgrange scoffed: "Pélissier can win any race except the Tour."

His disagreements and walkouts fired the public — 'it excited the public more than the boring way the flahutes rode,' as one French writer puts it — but it enraged everyone else.

Oscar Egg said:

In 1914, I held the world record for the hour and I won three stages of the Tour. In the results, Henri took second place behind Thys. At that time, he was an extraordinary rider, but I don't agree with those who said that he was a master tactician. He had an instinct for racing but if he'd been able to master his reflexes, keep control of the way he reacted, he would have been a phenomenal champion thanks to the extraordinary talent that he had."

Pélissier saw himself as a campaigner for better conditions for cyclists, whom he considered were paid little better than a pittance by their sponsors. He fought Desgrange's plan that riders in the Tour de France should be limited to equal amounts of food. Pélissier objected to what he considered other petty restrictions. In 1919 he abandoned the Tour because Desgrange would not allow him an extra glass of wine at a reception after one stage. He pulled out in 1920 because of the weather. He left on the fifth stage but he would have quit on the third had he had enough money to take the train from Morlaix. He asked followers to lend him the price of the ticket but they refused.

Pélissier rode beside Eugène Christophe to complain and Christophe persuaded him to keep riding. They rode hard — "only to keep warm', Pélissier said—and caught a group which turned out to be the leaders.

"I thought to myself, now I may as well win," he said afterwards and he did. He won the stage the next day as well and then pulled out on the fifth.

"Henri Pélissier is saturated with class but he does not know how to suffer," Desgrange wrote in L'Auto. Pélissier started a cyclists' trade union but it had only lukewarm support. Riders close to Pélissier joined it but other French riders and most foreigners stayed away, unsure they wanted to be led by a man already at war with sponsors and organisers across Europe.

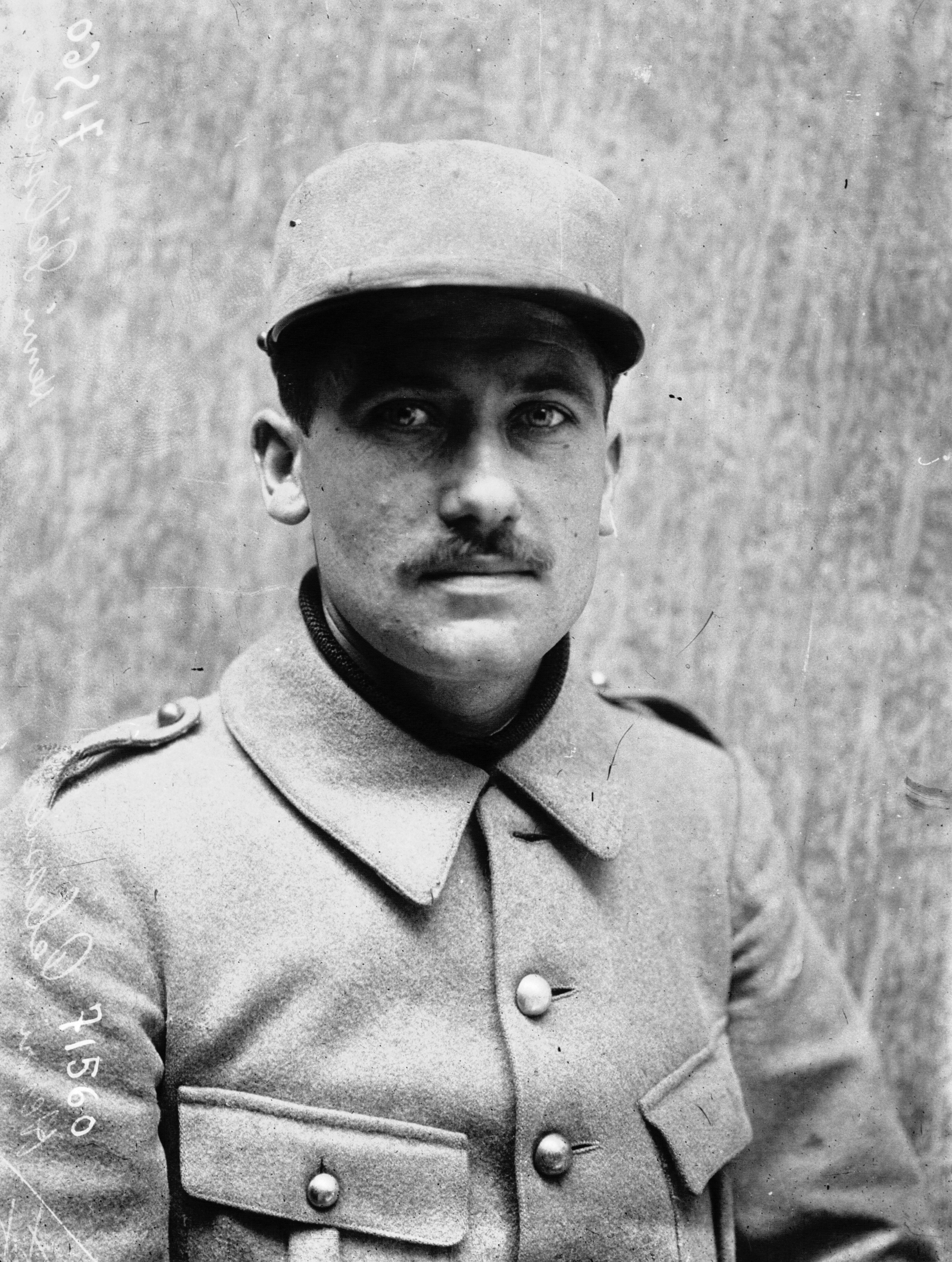
Henri Pelissier in 1919.

== Les Forçats de la route ==
Pélissier, Francis and another rider, Maurice Ville, abandoned the Tour at Coutances in 1924 after Desgrange had not let Pélissier remove a jersey as the sun came up. They were met in the station café by the journalist Albert Londres, who normally wrote about social and international affairs but was following the Tour for Le Petit Parisien. Londres' piece, reproduced largely as a dialogue, appeared under the headline Les Forçats de la Route.

"You wouldn't believe that all this is about nothing more than a few jerseys. This morning, in Cherbourg, a race official came up to me and without a word, he pulled up my jersey to check that I'm not wearing two. What would you say if I pulled open your waistcoat to see if your shirt was clean? That's the way these people behave and I won't stand for it. That's what this is all about."

"But what if you were wearing two jerseys?"

"That's the point. If I want to, I can wear 15. What I can't do is start with two and finish with only one."

"Why not?"

"Because that's the rule. We don't only have to work like donkeys, we have to freeze or suffocate as well. Apparently that's an important part of the sport. So I went off to find Desgrange. 'I can't throw my jersey on the road, then?' 'No,' he said, 'you can't throw away anything provided by the organisation.' 'But this isn't the organisation's—it's mine.'

"'I don't conduct arguments in the street,' he said. 'OK,' I said, 'if you're not prepared to talk about it in the street, I'm going back to bed.'

"'We'll sort it all out in Brest', he said. It will definitely be sorted out in Brest, I said, because I'm quitting. And I did."

Pélissier went to his brother, Francis, told him his decision and encouraged him to do the same. Francis said that suited him because he had a bad stomach and no enthusiasm for racing. Ville said he hadn't been part of the strike but that the other two had picked him up along the road. He was too tired to go on, he said.

"You have no idea what the Tour de France is,' Henri said. "It's a calvary. And what's more, the way to the cross only had 14 stations — we've got 15. We suffer on the road. But do you want to see how we keep going? Wait...'

From his bag he takes a phial. "That, that's cocaine for our eyes and chloroform for our gums..."

"Here," said Ville, tipping out the contents of his bag, "horse liniment to keep my knees warm. And pills? You want to see the pills?" They got out three boxes apiece.

"In short," said Francis, "we run on dynamite.'

Henri takes up the story. "You ever seen the baths at the finish? It's worth buying a ticket. You go in plastered with mud and you come out as white as a sheet. We're drained all the time by diarrhoea. Have a look at the water. We can't sleep at night. We're twitching as if we've got St Vitus's Dance. You see my shoelaces? They're leather, as hard as nails, but they're always breaking. So imagine what happens to our skin. And our toenails. I've lost six. They fall off a bit at a time all through the stage. They wouldn't treat mules the way we're treated. We're not weaklings, but my God, they treat us so brutally. And if I so much as stick a newspaper under my jersey at the start, they check to see it's still there at the finish. One day they'll start putting lumps of lead in our pocket because God made men too light."

Londres had the best colour piece he'd ever written, although Francis claimed afterwards they'd taken advantage of his gullibility by exaggerating.

== Retirement ==
Pélissier rode his last Tour de France in 1925. He did not finish. He stopped racing in 1927. He did nothing for two years after ending his career, then returned as a motorcycle-pacer and team manager. He had little success at either. In 1932 he wrote his impressions of the Tour de France for Paris-Soir. He remained bitter about those he believed treated cyclists as little better than slaves, said the broadcaster Jean-Paul Brouchon, while forgetting that cycling had made him rich.

== Death ==
Pélissier's first wife, Léonie, despaired and shot herself in 1933. Three years later Pélissier took a lover, Camille Tharault whom he called Miete, who was 20 years his junior. He threatened her with a knife at least once. He was 46 and had not raced for eight years. On 1 May 1935, he and Camille had a row in the kitchen of their Norman-style villa at Fourcherolles, near Dampierre, outside Paris. Pélissier lunged at her with a knife, cutting her face. She ran to the bedroom, opened a drawer and pulled out the revolver with which Léonie had shot herself. She ran back to the kitchen and found Pélissier waiting with the knife.

At that moment both saw the other threatening and Camille pulled the trigger five times. Pélissier fell to the floor. A bullet had hit the carotid artery. His body was placed in the room where Léonie had killed herself.

Next day, Paris-Soir's headline was:

THE TRAGIC END OF HENRI PÉLISSIER surprises no-one at Dampierre
'If I'd had the money I would have left him long ago' the murderess said yesterday

Albert Baker d'Isy wrote:

"He had few friendships because of his absolute opinions, and the way he expressed them cost him many friends... But they all bowed to the great quality of a champion that they considered the greatest French rider since the [first world] war." Léo Breton, president of the UVF, the French federation, called Pélissier the greatest rider of all time.

Camille's trial opened a year later, almost to the day. She pleaded self-defence and on 26 May 1936, she got a year's suspended jail sentence. It was as close as the court could come to acquitting her.

== Memorial ==
Fans at the Parc des Princes bought a bas-relief memorial to Henri, Francis and Charles Pélissier and put it up at the velodrome. It was moved to the Piste Municipale after demolition of the Parc des Princes. It is on the right beyond the inner metal gate.

== Career achievements ==
=== Major results ===
1911
1st Giro di Lombardia
1st Milano–Torino
1912
1st Milan–San Remo
1913
1st Giro di Lombardia
1st Stage 3 Tour de France
1914
2nd Overall Tour de France

1st Stages 10, 12 & 15

1919
1st Paris–Roubaix
1st Bordeaux–Paris
Tour de France

1st Stages 2 & 3

1920
1st Giro di Lombardia
1st Paris–Brussels
1st Circuit des Champs de Bataille
Tour de France

1st Stages 3 & 4

1921
1st Paris–Roubaix
1922
1st Paris–Tours
1923
1st Overall Tour de France

1st Stages 3, 10 & 11

1924
2nd Overall Tour of the Basque Country

=== Grand Tour results timeline ===
	1912	1913	1914	1915	1916	1917	1918	1919	1920	1921	1922	1923	1924	1925
Giro d'Italia	DNE	DNE	DNE	N/A	N/A	N/A	N/A	DNE	DNE	DNE	DNE	DNE	DNE	DNE
Stages won	—	—	—	N/A	N/A	N/A	N/A	—	—	—	—	—	—	—
Tour de France	DNF-4	DNF-6	2	N/A	N/A	N/A	N/A	DNF-5	DNF-5	DNE	DNE	1	DNF-3	DNF-4
Stages won	0	1	3	N/A	N/A	N/A	N/A	1	2	—	—	3	0	0
Vuelta a España	N/A	N/A	N/A	N/A	N/A	N/A	N/A	N/A	N/A	N/A	N/A	N/A	N/A	N/A
Stages won	N/A	N/A	N/A	N/A	N/A	N/A	N/A	N/A	N/A	N/A	N/A	N/A	N/A	N/A

Legend
1	Winner
2–3	Top three-finish
4–10	Top ten-finish
11–	Other finish
DNE	Did not enter
DNF-x	Did not finish (retired on stage x)
DNS-x	Did not start (not started on stage x)
HD-x	Finished outside time limit (occurred on stage x)
DSQ	Disqualified
N/A	Race/classification not held
NR	Not ranked in this classification

== See also ==
- List of doping cases in cycling
