= Joseph Van Daele =

Belgian cyclist

- Van Daele as Belgian champion in 1920

Personal information
- Full name: Joseph Van Daele
- Born: 16 December 1889 Wattrelos, France
- Died: 14 February 1948 (aged 58) Amiens, France

Cycling career
- Sport: Cycling
- Discipline: Road
- Role: Rider

Professional teams
- 1912: J.B.Louvet - Stucchi - Gerbi
- 1913: Legnano - JB - Louvet
- 1919–1920: La Sportive

Major wins
- Belgian National Road Race Champion

Joseph Van Daele (16 December 1889 – 14 February 1948) was a Belgian champion cyclist who was a professional rider between 1912 and 1926. He participated in many top cycle races of the time including the Tour de France where he finished eighth in 1919.

== Palmarès ==
1910
2nd Ronde van België, Amateur

1911
1st Liège–Bastogne–Liège
1st Ronde van België, Independent (professional)
1st Antwerpen - Menen
2nd Bruxelles - Liège (BEL)

1912
2nd Paris - Menin
3rd Brussel - Oupeye

1913
1st (Belgium) Belgian National Road Race Championships
1st Tour du Hainaut
2nd Tour of Flanders
2nd Etoile Caroloregienne
2nd Stage 9 Tour de France, Nice

1914
2nd Belgian National Road Race Championships
3rd Paris–Brussels

1919
2nd Belgian National Road Race Championships
8th Tour de France

3rd Stage 1 Tour de France, Le Havre
3rd Stage 14 Tour de France, Dunkirk

1920
2nd Stage 9 Tour de France, Nice

1921
1st Stage 1 Ronde van België, Ghent

1926
2nd Paris - Arras
2nd Paris - Dinant
