= Alfred Steux =

Belgian cyclist

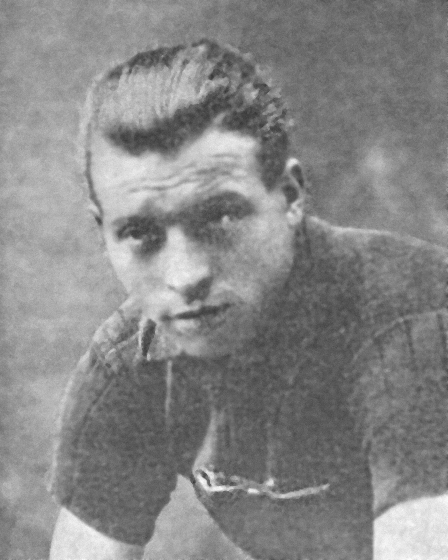
Late Alfred Steux

Alfred Steux (born 24 May 1892 in Dottignies - died 9 August 1934 in Paris) was a Belgian road racing cyclist who participated in the 1919 Tour de France and finished ninth. He finished in tenth place in the 1919 Paris–Roubaix.
