= Jules Nempon =

French cyclist

Personal information
- Full name: Jules Nempon
- Born: 2 March 1890 Armbouts-Cappel, France
- Died: 7 June 1974 (aged 84) Saint-Omer, France

Cycling career
- Sport: Cycling
- Discipline: Road
- Role: Rider

Professional teams
- 1911: Le Globe-Dunlop
- 1912–1914: JB Louvet
- 1919, 1922: Nempon Cycles
- 1923: Austral

Jules Nempon was a French road racing cyclist. Nempon was born on 2 March 1890 in Armbouts-Cappel. Nempon first participated in the Tour de France in 1911, but did not finish. In total, he started in 10 Tours de France. His best result was the 1919 Tour de France, where he finished tenth. Because there were only 10 finishers, he also receiving the Lanterne rouge for finishing in the last place.

Nempon died on 7 June 1974 in Saint-Omer.
