= Jacques Coomans =

Belgian cyclist (1888–1980)

Jacques Coopmans
Personal information
- Born: 13 November 1888 Magnée, Belgium
- Died: 1 September 1980 (aged 91) Liège, Belgium

Cycling career
- Sport: Cycling
- Discipline: Road
- Role: Rider

Professional teams
- 1912: Thomann
- 1913: Labor-Soly
- 1914: Thomann-Soly
- 1919–1920: La Sportive
- 1921: Individual
- 1923: Alcyon-Dunlop
- 1924–1925: Individual

Jacques Coomans (3 November 1888 – 1980) was a Belgian road racing cyclist. He finished in the top ten of Liège–Bastogne–Liège on five occasions, including second place in 1912 and third in 1920. He also competed in seven editions of the Tour de France, achieving his best result with sixth place in 1919.

== Biography ==
Coopmans was born in Magnée, now part of Fléron, Belgium. He began his racing career as an amateur, winning the Belgian Amateur National Road Championship and the Tour of Belgium for amateurs in 1910. He turned professional in May 1912 with the Thomann team.

Throughout his career, Coopmans had five top-ten finishes in Liège–Bastogne–Liège. His best results were second place in 1912 and third place in 1920. Between 1912 and 1925, Coopmans competed in seven editions of the Tour de France. He finished 17th in 1912, 19th in 1914 and achieved his best overall result of sixth place in 1919.

He died in Liège on 1 September 1980, aged 91.

== Major results ==
1909
10th Liège–Bastogne–Liège

1910
1st Belgian Amateur National Road Champion
1st Overall Étoile Carolorégienne

1st Stage 1

1st Overall Tour of Belgium Amateurs

1st Stages 5 & 7

1911
1st Brussels–Liège
2nd Brussels–Gembloux
3rd Huit Jours d'Alcyon
8th Liège–Bastogne–Liège

1912
1st Brussels–Oupeye
2nd Liège–Bastogne–Liège
3rd Tour du Hainaut
3rd Paris–Calais

1913
1st Belgian Interclubs Champion
3rd Ronde van Haspengouw

1919
3rd Belgian Interclubs Championship
6th Overall Tour de France

1920
3rd Liège–Bastogne–Liège

1921
2nd Retinne–Marche–Retinne

1922
2nd Sclessin–Marche–Sclessin
7th Liège–Bastogne–Liège

=== Grand Tour results timeline ===
Grand Tour	1912	1913	1914	1919	1920	1921	1925
Tour de France	17th	DNF (Stage 7)	19th	6th	DNF (Stage 4)	DNF (Stage 6)	DNF (Stage 3)
