= 1919 Tour de France =

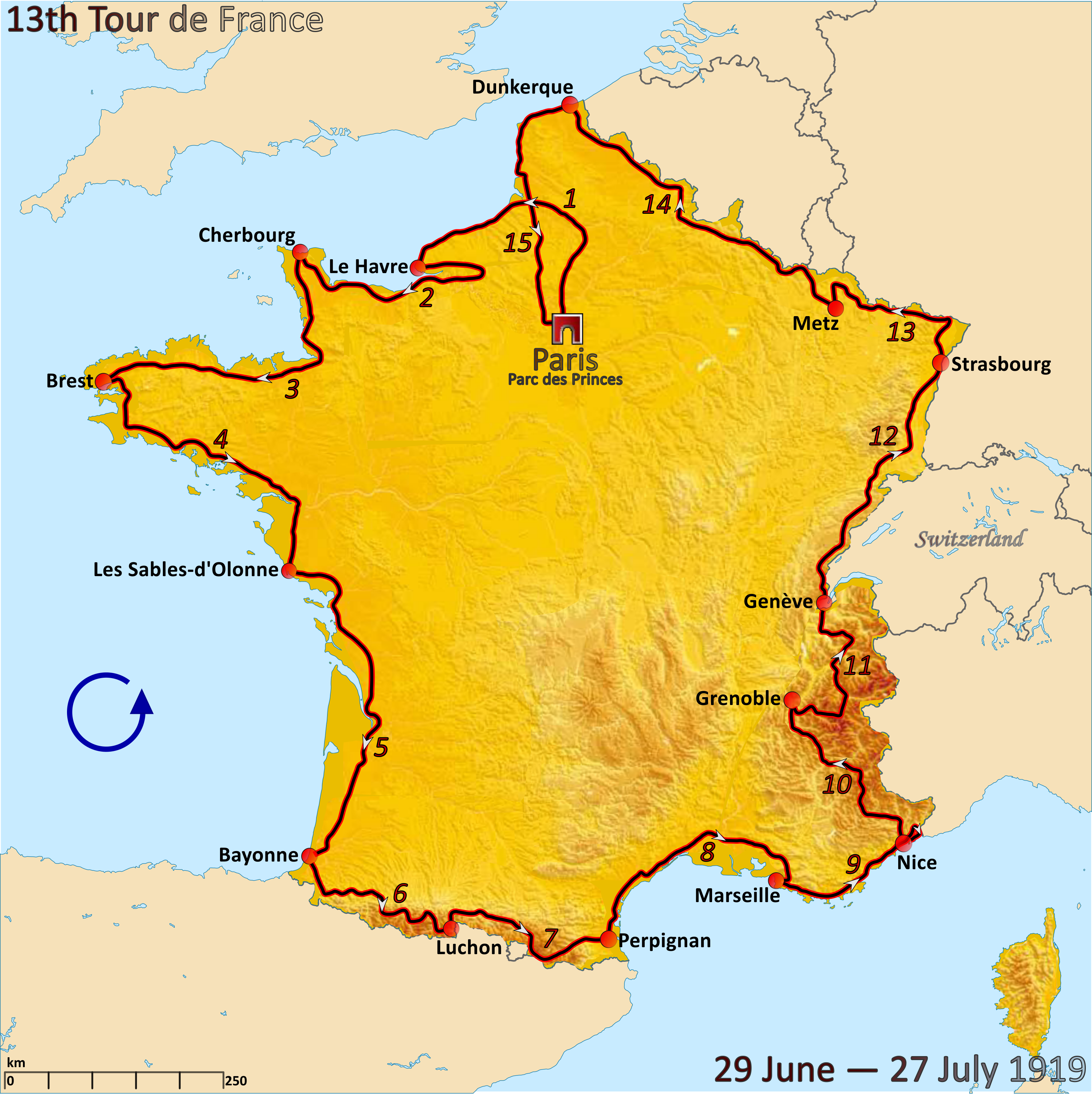
- Route of the 1919 Tour de France followed counterclockwise, starting in Paris

Race details
- Dates: 29 June – 27 July 1919
- Stages: 15
- Distance: 5,560 km (3,450 mi)
- Winning time: 231h 07' 15"

Results
Jersey awarded to the overall winner	Winner	Firmin Lambot (BEL)	(Category A)
	Second	Jean Alavoine (FRA)	(Category A)
	Third	Eugène Christophe (FRA)	(Category A)

The 1919 Tour de France was the 13th edition, taking place from 29 June to 27 July covering a total distance of 5,560 kilometres (3,450 mi). It was the first Tour de France after World War I, and was won by Firmin Lambot. Following the tenth stage, the yellow jersey, given to the leader of the general classification, was introduced, and first worn by Eugène Christophe.

The fighting in World War I had ravaged the French road system, which made cycling difficult. As a result, the average speed (24.056 km/h) and the number of finishing cyclists (ten) were the lowest in history.

== Background ==
Since the previous Tour de France in 1914, it was impossible to organize the Tour de France due to World War I. Tour organizer Henri Desgrange always wanted to organize a Tour after the war, and within days after the end of the war, the organization of the 1919 Tour de France started.

== Innovations and changes ==
Three former winners of the Tour, François Faber, Octave Lapize and Lucien Petit-Breton had died fighting in the war. Two other former winners, Philippe Thys and Odile Defraye, started the race. The war had been over for only seven months, so most cyclists did not have a chance to adequately train for the Tour. For that reason, there were almost no new younger cyclists, and the older cyclists dominated the race. The organization did not make it easy for the cyclists: with the addition of a stop at Strasbourg (recently recovered in the war), the length was extended to 5560 km: longer than all the previous Tours. Since then, only the 1926 Tour de France has been longer.

The bicycle manufacturers also suffered from the war and were unable to sponsor teams of cyclists. They worked together and sponsored more than half of the cyclists under the name "La Sportive", but effectively all the cyclists rode as individuals, wearing grey jerseys. The lack of team colours made riders indistinguishable and lead to the introduction of the leader's jersey. Cyclists were divided in an A-category (professional) and a B-category (amateurs).

In previous years, cyclists had to take care of their own food during the race. In 1919, the tour organisation took care of this.

== Race overview ==
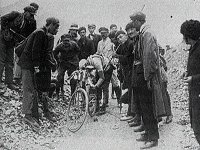
Eugène Christophe lead the race for most of the 1919 Tour de France, but did not win it due to a broken fork.

The first stage was won by Belgian Jean Rossius. However, he was penalised 30 minutes for illegally helping Philippe Thys (handing him a water bottle), therefore giving Henri Pélissier the lead in the race. It did not help Thys, however, because he had to abandon the race in the first stage after a large crash.

In the beginning of the race, Henri and Francis Pélissier were the best. They both finished before the rest in stage two, with Henri crossing the line first. In the third stage, Henri, leading the race, wanted to stop. Organizer Desgrange did all he could to change Pélissier's mind, and finally Pélissier started to race again. He was already 45 minutes behind, and the next three hours he was chasing the rest. He finally caught up, and finished second in the sprint, after his brother Francis. After that victory, Henri Pélissier said that he was a thoroughbred and the rest of the cyclists were work horses, which made the other cyclists angry. During that third stage, Léon Scieur punctured four times, and lost two hours.

In the fourth stage, the rest of the cyclists (only 25 were still in race) took revenge on the Pélissier brothers. When they had to change bicycles, everybody else sped away from them. Henri Pélissier chased the rest, but was then ordered by Desgrange to stop working together with other cyclists in his pursuit. In the end, Henri Pélissier had lost more than 35 minutes, and his brother Francis over three hours. The Pélissier brothers were angry at the organisation and left the race. Jean Alavoine won the stage, and Eugène Christophe became the new leader in the general classification.

Alavoine would also win the fifth stage, the longest ever in history at 482 kilometres (300 mi). Christophe was still in Grenoble at the start of stage eleven, when, at 2am tour organiser Henri Desgrange gave him a yellow jersey, so that he could easily be recognized. The colour was inspired by the colour of the organizing newspaper, l'Auto, although another explanation is that other colours were not available in the post-war shortage. Previously the leader would wear a green armband. Christophe was not happy with his yellow jersey, and other cyclists called him a canary. At that point in the race, it was likely that Christophe would stay the leader until the end of the Tour de France, because he remained in that yellow jersey after the Pyrenees and the Alps. In the penultimate stage, Firmin Lambot, who was in second position, more than 28 minutes behind, attacked. Christophe, still leading the race, chased him, but broke his fork close to Valenciennes. The rules were such that cyclists could get no help at all, so Christophe repaired his bicycle himself. This same thing had already cost him the victory in 1913, and would happen to him for a third time in 1922. It took him over two and a half hours, and he had lost the lead to Lambot. In the last stage, Christophe had a record number of punctures, and also lost his second place to Jean Alavoine. Lambot, aged 33, was at that moment the oldest Tour de France winner in history.

Because the organising newspaper, l'Auto, felt bad for Christophe, he received the same prize money as the winner Lambot. In addition, a collection raised money, the donors for this prize were reported in 20 pages in the newspaper. Altogether, Christophe received 13310 Francs, much more than the 5000 Francs that Lambot received for his victory.

== Results ==
In each stage, all cyclists started together. The cyclist who reached the finish first, was the winner of the stage. The time that each cyclist required to finish the stage was recorded. For the general classification, these times were added up; the cyclist with the least accumulated time was the race leader. From the eleventh stage on, the leader in the general classification was identified by the yellow jersey.

=== Stage winners ===
Stage characteristics and winners
Stage	Date	Course	Distance	Type (Note: In 1919, there was no distinction in the rules between plain stages and mountain stages; the icons shown here indicate which stage included mountains.)	Winner	Race leader
1	29 June	Paris to Le Havre	388 km (241 mi)	Plain stage	Jean Rossius (BEL)	Henri Pélissier (FRA) (Note: The winner of stage 1, Rossius, received a 30-minute penalty, so after stage 1 Henri Pélissier, who finished second, was leading the race.)
2	1 July	Le Havre to Cherbourg-en-Cotentin	364 km (226 mi)	Plain stage	Henri Pélissier (FRA)	Henri Pélissier (FRA)
3	3 July	Cherbourg to Brest	405 km (252 mi)	Plain stage	Francis Pélissier (FRA)	Henri Pélissier (FRA)
4	5 July	Brest to Les Sables-d'Olonne	412 km (256 mi)	Plain stage	Jean Alavoine (FRA)	Eugène Christophe (FRA)
5	7 July	Les Sables-d'Olonne to Bayonne	482 km (300 mi)	Plain stage	Jean Alavoine (FRA)	Eugène Christophe (FRA)
6	9 July	Bayonne to Luchon	326 km (203 mi)	Stage with mountain	Honore Barthelemy (FRA)	Eugène Christophe (FRA)
7	11 July	Luchon to Perpignan	323 km (201 mi)	Stage with mountain	Jean Alavoine (FRA)	Eugène Christophe (FRA)
8	13 July	Perpignan to Marseille	370 km (230 mi)	Plain stage	Jean Alavoine (FRA)	Eugène Christophe (FRA)
9	15 July	Marseille to Nice	338 km (210 mi)	Stage with mountain	Honoré Barthélemy (FRA)	Eugène Christophe (FRA)
10	17 July	Nice to Grenoble	333 km (207 mi)	Stage with mountain	Honoré Barthélemy (FRA)	Eugène Christophe (FRA)
11	19 July	Grenoble to Geneva	325 km (202 mi)	Stage with mountain	Honoré Barthélemy (FRA)	Eugène Christophe (FRA)
12	21 July	Geneva to Strasbourg	371 km (231 mi)	Stage with mountain	Luigi Lucotti (ITA)	Eugène Christophe (FRA)
13	23 July	Strasbourg to Metz	315 km (196 mi)	Plain stage	Luigi Lucotti (ITA)	Eugène Christophe (FRA)
14	25 July	Metz to Dunkerque	468 km (291 mi)	Plain stage	Firmin Lambot (BEL)	Firmin Lambot (BEL)
15	27 July	Dunkerque to Paris	340 km (210 mi)	Plain stage	Jean Alavoine (FRA)	Firmin Lambot (BEL)
	Total		5,560 km (3,455 mi)			

=== General classification ===
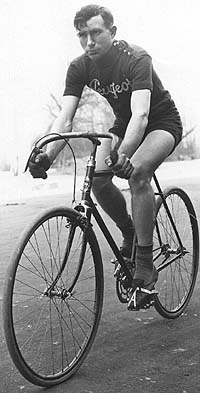
Firmin Lambot, the winner of the 1919 Tour

Of the 67 cyclists that started the race, only 11 cyclists finished. On 12 August 1919, Paul Duboc (8th overall), was disqualified for borrowing a car to go and repair his pedal axle, which left only 10 cyclists in the final classification. In total, 43 cyclists started as category A, and 24 cyclists as category B.

Final general classification (1–10)
Rank	Rider	Category	Time
1	Firmin Lambot (BEL)	A	231h 07' 15"
2	Jean Alavoine (FRA)	A	+ 1h 42' 54"
3	Eugène Christophe (FRA)	A	+ 2h 26' 31"
4	Léon Scieur (BEL)	A	+ 2h 52' 15"
5	Honoré Barthélemy (FRA)	A	+ 4h 14' 22"
6	Jacques Coomans (BEL)	A	+ 15h 21' 34"
7	Luigi Lucotti (ITA)	A	+ 16h 01' 12"
8	Joseph Van Daele (BEL)	A	+ 18h 23' 02"
9	Alfred Steux (BEL)	A	+ 20h 29' 01"
10	Jules Nempon (FRA)	B	+ 21h 44' 12"

== Aftermath ==
The yellow jersey, which was introduced in this tour, was so successful that it has been used ever since. Thys claimed to have worn the first yellow jersey when leading in 1913: Desgrange had requested him to wear a distinguishable coloured jersey, so his team manager found him a yellow jersey. The winner of the race, Lambot, would later also win the 1922 Tour de France, but has become a half-forgotten figure in the Tour's history.

The fight between cyclist Pélissier and tour organiser Desgrange would continue for many years. Pélissier would win the 1923 Tour de France.

== Bibliography ==
- Augendre, Jacques (2016). "Guide historique" [Historical guide] (PDF). Tour de France (in French). Paris: Amaury Sport Organisation. Archived (PDF) from the original on 17 August 2016.
- Cossins, Peter; Best, Isabel; Sidwells, Chris; Griffith, Clare (2013). Le Tour 100: The Definitive History of the World's Greatest Race. London: Hachette UK. ISBN 978-1-84403-759-9.
- McGann, Bill; McGann, Carol (2006). The Story of the Tour de France: 1903–1964. Vol. 1. Indianapolis, IN: Dog Ear Publishing. ISBN 978-1-59858-180-5.
- Woodland, Les (2007) [1st. pub. 2003]. The Yellow Jersey Companion to the Tour de France. London: Yellow Jersey Press. ISBN 978-0-224-08016-3.
